= 2012 Tuvalu A-Division =

A-Division
- Season: 2012
- Champions: Nauti A
- Matches: 28
- Goals: 92 (3.29 per match)
- Top goalscorer: Alopua Petoa (10 goals)
- Highest scoring: Tofaga A 7−1 Niutao A (8 goals)

The 2012 Tuvalu A-Division (also known as the 2012 National Provident Fund Championship League) was the 12th season of top flight association football in Tuvalu. The Tuvalu A-Division season began on 4 February 2012 and finished on 17 March 2012. The champions were Nauti FC who won their seventh league title.

Football in Tuvalu is played at club and national team level. The Tuvalu national football team draws from players in the Tuvalu A-Division; the national team competes in the Pacific Games and South Pacific Games. The national team is controlled by the Tuvalu National Football Association (TNFA).

== Tuvalu A-Division competition ==
The competition takes place at the 1,500-capacity Tuvalu Sports Ground in Funafuti, this is the only football field in Tuvalu. The football clubs are based on the communities of the 8 major islands of Tuvalu, with the rivalry between these 8 teams being maintained by each having a ‘home’ island.

== Clubs ==
Location of the represented clubs (islands) in the 2012 A-Division

Club	Island
Lakena United A	Nanumea
Manu Laeva A	Nukulaelae
Nanumaga A	Nanumanga
Nauti A	Funafuti
Niutao A	Niutao
Nui A	Nui
Tamanuku A	Nukufetau
Tofaga A	Vaitupu

== Standings ==
Pos	Team	Pld	W	D	L	GF	GA	GD	Pts
1	Nauti A	7	5	1	1	16	7	+9	16
2	Tamanuku A	7	5	0	2	13	7	+6	15
3	Manu Laeva A	7	4	2	1	15	6	+9	14
4	Tofaga A	7	4	1	2	20	6	+14	13
5	Nanumaga A	7	3	0	4	12	9	+3	9
6	Niutao A	7	3	0	4	14	20	−6	9
7	Lakena United A	7	2	0	5	8	24	−16	6
8	Nui A	7	0	0	7	2	22	−20	0

Updated to match(es) played on 5 February 2012. Source:
Rules for classification: 1) points; 2) goal difference; 3) number of goals scored.

== Round 1 ==
3 February 2012

Nauti A	2 - 3	Lakena United A
	Report

Tuvalu Sports Ground, Funafuti

3 February 2012

Manu Laeva A	1 - 2	Niutao A
	Report

Tuvalu Sports Ground, Funafuti

4 February 2012

Tamanuku A	1 - 0	Nanumaga A
	Report

Tuvalu Sports Ground, Funafuti

4 February 2012

Tofaga A	4 – 1	Nui A
Malakai Alesana	Report	Lopati Okelani

Tuvalu Sports Ground, Funafuti

== Round 2 ==
10 February 2012

Manu Laeva A	5 - 0	Lakena United A
	Report

Tuvalu Sports Ground, Funafuti

11 February 2012

Nauti A	2 - 0	Niutao A
	Report

Tuvalu Sports Ground, Funafuti

11 February 2012

Tofaga	2 – 0	Nanumaga
Saamu Liufau	Report

Tuvalu Sports Ground, Funafuti

4 February 2012

Tamanuku A	3 - 0^{1}	Nui A
	Report

Tuvalu Sports Ground, Funafuti

1 Tamanuku win by default.

== Round 3 ==
17 February 2012

Tofaga A	0 – 2	Nauti A
	Report	Teainuku; Afelee

Tuvalu Sports Ground, Funafuti

16 February 2012

Nui A	1 - 3	Niutao A
	Report

Tuvalu Sports Ground, Funafuti

18 February 2012

Lakena United A	0 - 2	Nanumaga A
	Report

Tuvalu Sports Ground, Funafuti

17 February 2012

Manu Laeva A	2 - 1	Tamanuku A
	Report

Tuvalu Sports Ground, Funafuti

== Round 4 ==
24 February 2012

Nanumaga A	1 - 2	Manu Laeva A
	Report

Tuvalu Sports Ground, Funafuti

24 February 2012

Tofaga A	0 – 1	Tamanuku A
	Report	Felo Feoto

Tuvalu Sports Ground, Funafuti

25 February 2012

Nui A	0 - 3 ^{1}	Nauti A
	Report

Tuvalu Sports Ground, Funafuti

25 February 2012

Lakena United A	2 - 6	Niutao A
	Report

Tuvalu Sports Ground, Funafuti

1 Nauti win by default.

== Round 5 ==
3 March 2012

Tofaga A	6 – 0	Lakena United A
Alopua Petoa; Malakai Alesana; Falefou Tapugao Jr	Report

Tuvalu Sports Ground, Funafuti

3 March 2012

Tamanuku A	1 - 3	Nauti A
	Report

Tuvalu Sports Ground, Funafuti

25 February 2012

Nui A	0 - 3 ^{1}	Manu Laeva A
	Report

Tuvalu Sports Ground, Funafuti

3 March 2012

Niutao A	1 - 4	Nanumaga A
	Report

Tuvalu Sports Ground, Funafuti

1 Manu Laeva win by default.

== Round 6 ==
10 March 2012

Nauti A	3 - 2	Nanumaga A
	Report

Tuvalu Sports Ground, Funafuti

10 March 2012

Manu Laeva A	1 – 1	Tofaga A
Jelly Selau	Report	Malakai Alesana

Tuvalu Sports Ground, Funafuti

10 March 2012

Tamanuku A	3 - 1	Niutao A
	Report

Tuvalu Sports Ground, Funafuti

10 March 2012

Lakena United A	3 - 0 ^{1}	Nui A
	Report

Tuvalu Sports Ground, Funafuti

1 Lakena United win by default.

== Round 7 ==
17 March 2012

Manu Laeva A	1 - 1	Nauti A
	Report

Tuvalu Sports Ground, Funafuti

17 March 2012

Tofaga A	7 – 1	Niutao A
Alopua Petoa; Falefou Tapugao Jr	Report	Ioane Haumili

Tuvalu Sports Ground, Funafuti

17 March 2012

Tamanuku A	3 - 1	Lakena United A
	Report

Tuvalu Sports Ground, Funafuti

17 March 2012

Nui A	0 - 3 ^{1}	Nanumaga A
	Report

Tuvalu Sports Ground, Funafuti

1 Nanumaga win by default.

== Top goalscorers ==
Pos.	Player	Club	Goals
1	(Tuvalu) Alopua Petoa	Tofaga A	10
2	(Tuvalu) Felo Feoto	Tamanuku A	5
2	(Tuvalu) Malakai Alesana	Tofaga A	5

=== Awards ===
==== Best Player ====
The best player for the tournament was Okilani Tinilau of FC Manu Laeva.
