= Tuvaluan football league system =

The Tuvaluan football league system, is a series of non-interconnected leagues for club football in Tuvalu. The league is organized by the Tuvalu National Football Association. Eight of the nine islands in Tuvalu are represented in the competition. Niulakita is the only island that has no football club. Some clubs have two teams competing. The competition takes place at the 1,500-capacity Tuvalu Sports Ground in Funafuti, this is the only soccer field in Tuvalu. The football clubs are based on the communities of the 8 major islands of Tuvalu, with the rivalry between these 8 teams being maintained by each having a ‘home’ island.

The Tuvalu A-division has no relegation rule. The B-Division is the competition for the B teams of each club. The same applies for the C-Division. The competition was founded in 2001.

== Structure ==
The A-Division contains 8 teams. Alongside the A-Division is the B-Division (Level 2), which contains 5 reserve teams of clubs in the A-Division. All the teams in the A and B-Division are amateur teams and there is no promotion or relegation between the two.

Club	Island	Stadium	Capacity
Lakena United	Nanumea	Tuvalu Sports Ground	1,500
Manu Laeva	Nukulaelae	Tuvalu Sports Ground	1,500
Ha'apai United	Nanumanga	Tuvalu Sports Ground	1,500
Nauti	Funafuti	Tuvalu Sports Ground	1,500
Tamanuku	Nukufetau	Tuvalu Sports Ground	1,500
Tofaga	Vaitupu	Tuvalu Sports Ground	1,500
Vaoloa	Nui	Tuvalu Sports Ground	1,500
Niutao	Niutao	Tuvalu Sports Ground	1,500
