= 2005 Tuvalu A-Division =

A-Division
- Season: 2005
- Champions: Nauti FC
- Matches: 21
- Goals: 123 (5.86 per match)

The 2005 Tuvalu A-Division (also known as the 2005 National Provident Fund Championship League) is the fifth season of association football competition in Tuvalu. The champions of the Tuvalu A-Division were Nauti FC.

Football in Tuvalu is played at club and national team level. The Tuvalu national football team draws from players in the Tuvalu A-Division; the national team competes in the Pacific Games and South Pacific Games. The national team is controlled by the Tuvalu National Football Association (TNFA).

== Tuvalu A-Division competition ==
The competition takes place at the 1,500-capacity Tuvalu Sports Ground in Funafuti, this is the only soccer field in Tuvalu. The football clubs are based on the communities of the 8 major islands of Tuvalu, with the rivalry between these 8 teams being maintained by each having a ‘home’ island.

Location of the represented clubs (islands) in the 2012 A-Division

Club	Island
Amatuku FC	Funafuti
Lakena United A	Nanumea
Nanumaga A	Nanumanga
Nauti A	Funafuti
Niutao A	Niutao
Nui A	Nui
Tamanuku A	Nukufetau
Tofaga A	Vaitupu

== Standings ==
Pos	Team	Pld	W	D	L	GF	GA	GD	Pts
1	Nauti A (Note: Nauti FC are described as Funafuti A in the source.) (C)	7	5	2	0	26	3	+23	17
2	Lakena United A	7	5	2	0	23	5	+18	17
3	Niutao A	7	4	0	3	13	10	+3	12
4	Tofaga A	7	3	2	2	20	13	+7	11
5	Nui A	7	2	2	3	11	15	−4	8
6	Tamanuku A	7	2	1	4	12	21	−9	7
7	Nanumaga A	7	0	4	3	11	22	−11	4
8	Amatuku FC	7	0	1	6	7	23	−16	1

Updated to match(es) played on 31 August 2012. Source: rsssf.com
Rules for classification: 1) points; 2) goal difference; 3) number of goals scored.
Total Goal Difference = +11 in source.
(C) Champions

== Top scorers ==
#	Player	Club	Goals
1	(Tuvalu) Felo Feoto	Tamanuku A	2
2	(Tuvalu) Koloa Tofaga	Tofaga A	2
3	(Tuvalu) Tanelu Tiute	Tofaga A	2
4	(Tuvalu) Viliamu Sekifu	Tofaga A	2
5	(Tuvalu) Pene	Amatuku FC	2
6	(Tuvalu) Siopepa Tailolo	Lakena United A	2
7	(Tuvalu) Lale Satalaka	Nui A	1
8	(Tuvalu) Leki	Tamanuku A	1
9	(Tuvalu) Paitela Kelemene	Tofaga A	1
10	(Tuvalu) Jay Timo	Nauti A	1
