= 2020 Tuvalu A-Division =

A-Division
- Season: 2020
- Champions: Nauti FC
- Relegated: No relegation
- Matches: 28
- Goals: 159 (5.68 per match)
- Top goalscorer: Hosea Sente (8 goals)
- Biggest home win: Nauti A1 11-1 Nauti A2; Nauti A1 10-0 Vaoloa
- Biggest away win: Vaoloa 0-24 Tofaga

The 2020 Tuvalu A-Division was the 20th season of top flight association football in Tuvalu. The season started in March 14 and finish on May 23 of the 2020.

== Tuvalu A-Division competition ==
The competition takes place at the 1,500-capacity Tuvalu Sports Ground in Funafuti, this is the only football field in Tuvalu. The football clubs are based on the communities of the 8 major islands of Tuvalu, with the rivalry between these 8 teams being maintained by each having a ‘home’ island.

== Clubs ==
The 2020 edition of the Tuvalu A-Division was played between 8 teams:

- Nauti FC A1 (Funafuti)
- Tofaga FC (Vaitupu)
- FC Niutao (Niutao)
- Nauti FC A2 (Funafuti)
- Tamanuku (Nukufetau)
- Lakena United (Nanumea)
- Vaoloa (Nui)
- Ha'apai United (Nanumaga)

== Matches ==
=== Round 1 ===
14 March 2020	Nauti A1	11-1	Nauti FC

14 March 2020	Lakena United	4-3	Ha'apai United

14 March 2020	FC Niutao	v	Vaoloa

14 March 2020	FC Tofaga	5-1	Tamanuku

=== Round 2 ===
18 April 2020	FC Tofaga	7-1	Ha'apai United

18 April 2020	Nauti FC A1	4-2	Lakena United

18 April 2020	FC Niutao	0-0	Nauti FC

18 April 2020	Tamanuku	2-3	Vaoloa

=== Round 3 ===
25 April 2020	Nauti FC A1	1-0	FC Niutao

25 April 2020	Tamanuku	2-1	Nauti FC

25 April 2020	FC Tofaga	5-1	Lakena United

25 April 2020	Ha'apai United	5-1	Vaoloa

=== Round 4 ===
2 May 2020	Ha'apai United	1-3	Nauti FC
	Sepuli 71'		Selilo 11' Teuati 12' Geoff 73'

2 May 2020	Vaoloa	3-3	Lakena United
	Peego 8' Pasiale 11', 30'		Tolua 10', 30' Vaieta 16'

2 May 2020	Tamanuku	2-3	FC Niutao
	Felo 73', 80'		Alani 13' Tefau 16', 78'

2 May 2020	Nauti FC A1	2-0	FC Tofaga
	Hosea 4' Steven 40'

=== Round 5 ===
9 May2020	Nauti FC A1	4-3	Tamanuku
	Kaitu 1' Hosea 8', 52' Nokisi 66'		Felo 45', 74' Ikapoti 80'

9 May 2020	Vaoloa	0-24	FC Tofaga
			Alopoua 8', 49', 54', 57' Eric 12', 29', 44' Sueni 16', 39', 72', 80' Falefou 26', 38' James 33', 35', 40', 70', 74' Fata 41', 50', 71' Katepu 64', 65', 68'

9 May 2020	Ha'apai United	1-3	FC Niutao
	Fakavae 34'		Tefau 18' Teni 42' Roger 65'

9 May 2020	Nauti FC A2	4-2	Lakena United
	Puleia 25', 68' John 29' (o.g.) Keni 64'		Kaumoana 44' Kee 71'

=== Round 6 ===
16 May 2020	Ha'apai United	2-6	Tamanuku
	Tafea 55' Sepuli 57'		Felo 7', 23' (pen.), 40' Liktuka 25', 43' Ka 73'

16 May 2020	Nauti FC A1	10-0	Vaoloa
	Kaitu 23' Nathan 29', 63', 80' Hosea 35', 43', 65', 70' Nokisi 37' Henry 78'

16 May 2020	Nauti FC A2	0-2	FC Tofaga
			James 1', 79'

16 May 2020	Lakena United	0-1	FC Niutao
			Tefau 22' (pen.)

=== Round 7 ===
23 May 2020	Lakena United	(awarded 0-3, Lakena forfeited)	Tamanuku

23 May 2020	FC Niutao	1-5	FC Tofaga
	Mataitela 1'		Katepu 8' (pen.) James 10', 15' Iasona 35' Fakavae 35'

23 May 2020	Nauti FC A2	(awarded 3-0, Vaoloa forfeited)	Vaoloa

23 May 2029	Nauti FC A1	3-0	Ha'apai United
	Ivan 5' Hosea 15' Telavi 49'

== Final Classification ==
1.Nauti A1            7   7  0  0  35- 6  21  Champions  Funafuti
-------------------------------------------------------------------
2.Tofaga              7   6  0  1  48- 6  18             Vaitupu
3.Niutao              7   4  1  2  11-11  13             Niutao
4.Nauti A2            7   3  1  3  12-18  10             Funafuti
5.Tamanuku            7   3  0  4  19-18   9             Nukufetau
6.Lakena United       7   1  1  5  12-23   4             Nanumea
7.Vaoloa              7   1  1  5   9-50   4             Nui
8.Ha'apai             7   1  0  6  13-27   3             Nanumaga

== Topscorer ==
Rank	Player	Team	Goals
1	Hosea Sente	Nauti A1	8
2	James Lepaio	Tofaga	7
3	Alopua Petoa	Tofaga	4
3	Felo Feoto	Tamanuku	4
3	Sueni Founuku	Tofaga	4
3	Tefau	Niutao	4
7	Eric Tealofi	Tofaga	3
7	Fata Filemoni	Tofaga	3
7	Katepu Iosua	Tofaga	3
7	Nathan Josh	Tofaga	3
