= 2011 Tuvalu A-Division =

A-Division
- Season: 2011
- Champions: Nauti FC
- Matches: 21
- Goals: 75 (3.57 per match)
- Top goalscorer: Starcel Soloseni; Lutelu Tiute; Siopepa Tailolo (6 goals)
- Highest scoring: Tofaga A1 6–4 Manu Laeva A (10 goals)

The 2011 Tuvalu A-Division (also known as the 2011 National Provident Fund Championship League) is the 11th season of top flight association football in Tuvalu. The Tuvalu A-Division season began on 29 January 2011 and ended on 12 March 2011. Nauti FC were the defending champions.

Football in Tuvalu is played at club and national team level. The Tuvalu national football team draws from players in the Tuvalu A-Division; the national team competes in the Pacific Games and South Pacific Games. The national team is controlled by the Tuvalu National Football Association (TNFA).

== Tuvalu A-Division competition ==
The competition takes place at the 1,500-capacity Tuvalu Sports Ground in Funafuti, this is the only football field in Tuvalu. The football clubs are based on the communities of the 8 major islands of Tuvalu, with the rivalry between these 8 teams being maintained by each having a ‘home’ island.

== Club information ==
Location of teams in the 2011 A-Division

Club	Island
Nauti A	Funafuti
Tofaga A1	Vaitupu
Tofaga A2	Vaitupu
Lakena United A1	Nanumea
Lakena United A2	Nanumea
Manu Laeva A	Nukulaelae
Tamanuku A	Nukufetau

== Regular Stage ==
=== Table ===
Pos	Team	Pld	W	D	L	GF	GA	GD	Pts
1	Nauti A	6	4	1	1	12	6	+6	13
2	Tofaga A1	6	2	4	0	12	9	+3	10
3	Lakena United A2	6	2	3	1	14	9	+5	9
4	Tofaga A2	6	2	2	2	10	10	0	8
5	Lakena United A1	6	2	2	2	7	10	−3	8
6	Manu Laeva A	6	2	1	3	10	16	−6	7
7	Tamanuku A	6	1	2	3	8	12	−4	5

Updated to match(es) played on 14 April 2012. Source:
Rules for classification: 1) points; 2) goal difference; 3) number of goals scored.

== Round 1 ==
These matches took place from the weekend of 29 January 2011.

Team 1	Score	Team 2
Nauti A	3−0	Tamanuku A
Manu Laeva A	1−1	Lakena United A2
Tofaga A1	0−0	Lakena United A1

== Round 2 ==
These matches took place from the weekend of 5 February 2011.

Team 1	Score	Team 2
Tofaga A2	2−1	Manu Laeva A
Lakena United A2	1−1	Tofaga A1
Lakena United A1	0−2	Nauti A

== Round 3 ==
These matches took place from the weekend of 12 February 2011.

Team 1	Score	Team 2
Lakena United A1	4−3	Lakena United A2
Nauti A	3−0	Manu Laeva A
Tamanuku A	0−2	Tofaga A2

== Round 4 ==
These matches took place from the weekend of 19 February 2011.

Team 1	Score	Team 2
Nauti A	1−1	Tofaga A1
Lakena United A2	3−1	Tofaga A2
Manu Laeva A	1−3	Tamanuku A

== Round 5 ==
These matches took place from the weekend of 26 February 2011.

Team 1	Score	Team 2
Manu Laeva A	3−1	Lakena United A1
Tofaga A2	2−2	Tofaga A1
Tamanuku A	2−2	Lakena United A2

== Round 6 ==
These matches took place from the weekend of 5 March 2011.

Team 1	Score	Team 2
Lakena United A1	2−2	Tamanuku A
Tofaga A1	6−4	Manu Laeva A
Tofaga A1	1−2	Nauti A

== Round 7 ==
These matches took place from the weekend of 12 March 2011.

Team 1	Score	Team 2
Lakena United A2	4−1	Nauti A
Lakena United A1	2−2	Tofaga A2
Tamanuku A	1−2	Tofaga A1

== Top goalscorers ==
#	Player	Club	Goals
1	(Tuvalu) Starzle	Manu Laeva A	6
2	(Tuvalu) Lutelu Tiute	Tofaga A1	6
3	(Tuvalu) Siopepa Tailolo	Lakena United A2	6
4	(Tuvalu) Naisali Kalisi	Nauti A	4
5	(Tuvalu) Lopati Okelani	Tofaga A1	3
6	(Tuvalu) Mase Tumua	Nauti A	3
7	(Tuvalu) Okilani Tinilau	Manu Laeva A	3
8	(Tuvalu) Fakaava Malua	Lakena United A2	2
9	(Tuvalu) Kanava Galuega	Lakena United A2	2
10	(Tuvalu) Togevai	Lakena United A2	2
