= 2019 Tuvalu A-Division =

A-Division
- Season: 2019
- Champions: Nauti FC
- Matches: 32
- Goals: 200 (6.25 per match)
- Top goalscorer: James Lepaio (15 goals)

The 2019 Tuvalu A-Division was the 19th season of top flight association football in Tuvalu. The season started and finish on 2019.

== Tuvalu A-Division competition ==
The competition takes place at the 1,500-capacity Tuvalu Sports Ground in Funafuti, this is the only football field in Tuvalu. The football clubs are based on the communities of the 8 major islands of Tuvalu, with the rivalry between these 8 teams being maintained by each having a ‘home’ island.

== Clubs ==
The 2019 edition of the Tuvalu A-Division was played between 9 teams (Tofaga FC entered 2 teams into the A-Division competition):

- Lakena United (Nanumea)
- FC Manu Laeva (Nukulaelae)
- Nauti FC A1 (Funafuti)
- Nauti FC A2 (Funafuti)
- FC Niutao (Niutao)
- Tamanuku (Nukufetau)
- Tofaga FC A1 (Vaitupu)
- Tofaga FC A2 (Vaitupu)
- Vaoloa (Nui)

== Classification Final ==
1.Nauti A1            7   6  0  1  46- 8  18 Champions
------------------------------------------------------
2.Tofaga A1           7   5  1  1  26- 5  16
3.Manu Laeva          7   4  2  1  29-12  14
4.Tamanuku            7   4  2  1  20-14  14
5.Lakena United       7   2  3  2  25-21   9
6.Vaoloa              7   2  2  3  15-18   8
7.Niutao              7   2  1  4  22-25   7
8.Nauti A2            7   1  1  5  11-42   4
9.Tofaga A2           8   0  0  8   6-55   0

== Topscorers ==
Rank	Player	Team	Goals
1	James Lepaio	Tofaga	15
2	Mafoa Petaia	Tamanuku	10
3	Hosea Sente	Nauti	9
4	Meneua Fekesega	Nauti A1	7
4	Nathan Josh	Nauti A1	7
4	Tupou Koliano	Manu Laeva	7
4	Tefou Lolesio	Niutao	7
4	Filemu Vanu	Lakena	7
