= 2014 Tuvalu A-Division =

A-Division
- Season: 2014
- Champions: Nauti A
- Matches: 27
- Goals: 113 (4.19 per match)
- Biggest home win: Tamanuku A 7-1 Nui A
- Biggest away win: Tofaga A 2-4 Nui A
- Highest scoring: Nauti A 7-2 Niutao A (9 goals)

The 2014 Tuvalu A-Division was the 14th season of top flight association football in Tuvalu. The Tuvalu A-Division season started on 22 February 2014 and finished on 8 April 2014.

== Tuvalu A-Division competition ==
The competition takes place at the 1,500-capacity Tuvalu Sports Ground in Funafuti, this is the only football field in Tuvalu. The football clubs are based on the communities of the 8 major islands of Tuvalu, with the rivalry between these 8 teams being maintained by each having a ‘home’ island.

== Clubs ==
Location of the represented clubs (islands) in the 2014 A-Division

Club	Island
Lakena United A	Nanumea
Manu Laeva A	Nukulaelae
Ha'apai United A	Nanumanga
Nauti A	Funafuti
Niutao A	Niutao
Nui A	Nui
Tamanuku A	Nukufetau
Tofaga A	Vaitupu

== Standings ==
Pos	Team	Pld	W	D	L	GF	GA	GD	Pts
1	Nauti A	7	5	2	0	21	8	+13	17
2	Tofaga A	7	5	0	2	17	11	+6	15
3	Ha'apai United A	7	4	1	2	12	8	+4	13
4	Lakena United A	7	2	3	2	16	15	+1	9
5	Manu Laeva A	7	2	2	3	18	16	+2	8
6	Nui A	7	2	2	3	10	16	−6	8
7	Tamanuku A	6	1	1	4	12	16	−4	4
8	Niutao A	6	0	1	5	7	23	−16	1

Updated to match(es) played on 24 February 2014. Source:
Rules for classification: 1) points; 2) goal difference; 3) number of goals scored.

== Round 1 ==
22 February 2014

Tofaga A	6 - 1	Niutao A

Tuvalu Sports Ground, Funafuti

22 February 2014

Nauti A	5 - 2	Tamanuku A

Tuvalu Sports Ground, Funafuti

22 February 2014

Lakena United A	5 - 3	Manu Laeva A

Tuvalu Sports Ground, Funafuti

24 February 2014

Nui A	1 - 2	Ha'apai United A

Tuvalu Sports Ground, Funafuti

== Round 2 ==
1 March 2014

Nauti A	7 - 2	Niutao A

Tuvalu Sports Ground, Funafuti

1 March 2014

Tofaga A	3 - 1	Manu Laeva A

Tuvalu Sports Ground, Funafuti

1 March 2014

Tamanuku A	7 - 1	Nui A

Tuvalu Sports Ground, Funafuti

1 March 2014

Lakena United A	2 - 2	Ha'apai United A

Tuvalu Sports Ground, Funafuti

== Round 3 ==
8 March 2014

Tofaga A	2 - 1	Ha'apai United A

Tuvalu Sports Ground, Funafuti

8 March 2014

Manu Laeva A	5 - 1	Niutao A

Tuvalu Sports Ground, Funafuti

8 March 2014

Tamanuku A	1 - 1	Lakena United A

Tuvalu Sports Ground, Funafuti

8 March 2014

Nauti A	2 - 0	Nui A

Tuvalu Sports Ground, Funafuti

== Round 4 ==
15 March 2014

Tofaga A	2 - 1	Tamanuku A

Tuvalu Sports Ground, Funafuti

15 March 2014

Manu Laeva A	1 - 3	Ha'apai United A

Tuvalu Sports Ground, Funafuti

15 March 2014

Nauti A	2 - 2	Lakena United A

Tuvalu Sports Ground, Funafuti

15 March 2014

Nui A	0 - 0	Niutao A

Tuvalu Sports Ground, Funafuti

== Round 5 ==
22 March 2014

Manu Laeva A	5 - 1	Tamanuku A

Tuvalu Sports Ground, Funafuti

22 March 2014

Nauti A	2 - 0	Tofaga A

Tuvalu Sports Ground, Funafuti

22 March 2014

Ha'apai United A	2 - 1	Niutao A

Tuvalu Sports Ground, Funafuti

22 March 2014

Lakena United A	2 - 3	Nui A

Tuvalu Sports Ground, Funafuti

== Round 6 ==
29 March 2014

Tofaga A	2 - 4	Nui A

Tuvalu Sports Ground, Funafuti

29 March 2014

Manu Laeva A	2 - 2	Nauti A

Tuvalu Sports Ground, Funafuti

29 March 2014

Niutao A	2 - 3	Lakena United A

Tuvalu Sports Ground, Funafuti

29 March 2014

Ha'apai United A	2 - 0	Tamanuku A

Tuvalu Sports Ground, Funafuti

== Round 7 ==
5 April 2014

Nauti A	1 - 0	Ha'apai United A

Tuvalu Sports Ground, Funafuti

5 April 2014

Tofaga A	2 - 1	Lakena United A

Tuvalu Sports Ground, Funafuti

5 April 2014

Manu Laeva A	1 - 1	Nui A

Tuvalu Sports Ground, Funafuti

5 April 2014

Niutao A	- cancelled	Tamanuku A

Tuvalu Sports Ground, Funafuti
