= 2024 Tuvalu A-Division =

A-Division
- Season: 2024
- Dates: 9 March 2024 – 23 March 2024
- Champions: Tofaga
- Matches: 20
- Goals: 125 (6.25 per match)

The 2024 Tuvalu A-Division was the 22nd season of top-flight association football in Tuvalu. The competition formed part of the Tuvalu Football Championship League 2023–24, organised by the Tuvalu Football Association and played in Riversdale, New Zealand. The A-Division was contested by seven teams, with Tofaga winning the championship. They finished level on 15 points with Niutao United, but were placed first on goal difference.

== Teams and locations ==
Location of the represented clubs (islands) in the 2024 A-Division season.

Team	Location
Tofaga	Vaitupu
Niutao United	Niutao
Manu Laeva	Nukulaelae
Nauti	Funafuti
Vaoloa	Nui
Kaumeile United	Tuvalu
Tamanuku	Nukufetau

The 2024 competition was unusual, as it was not played in Tuvalu. The championship was held in Riversdale, New Zealand, and was organised by the Tuvalu Football Association.

== League table ==
Pos	Team	Pld	W	D	L	GF	GA	GD	Pts
1	Tofaga (C)	6	5	0	1	26	9	+17	15
2	Niutao United	6	5	0	1	16	7	+9	15
3	Manu Laeva	6	3	1	2	19	17	+2	10
4	Nauti	5	3	0	2	14	9	+5	9
5	Vaoloa	6	1	1	4	10	15	−5	4
6	Kaumeile United	5	1	1	3	8	13	−5	4
7	Tamanuku	6	0	1	5	7	30	−23	1

Rules for classification: 1) Points; 2) Goal difference; 3) Goals scored
(C) Champions

== Results ==
Home \ Away	KAU	MAU	NAU	NIU	TAM	TOF	VAO
Kaumeile United							
Manu Laeva							
Nauti							
Niutao United							
Tamanuku							
Tofaga			1–3	4–0	3–3		
Vaoloa							

Source: https://rsssf.org/tablest/tuvalu2024.html
Legend: Blue = home team win; Yellow = draw; Red = away team win.
