= 2010 Tuvalu A-Division =

A-Division
- Season: 2010
- Champions: Nauti A

The 2010 Tuvalu A-Division was the tenth season of association football competition. The league was won by Nauti FC for the fourth consecutive time and the fifth time overall. For the 2010 season, the Tuvalu A-Division was named the Funafuti League.

== Tuvalu A-Division competition ==
The competition takes place at the 1,500-capacity Tuvalu Sports Ground in Funafuti, this is the only football field in Tuvalu. The football clubs are based on the communities of the 8 major islands of Tuvalu, with the rivalry between these 8 teams being maintained by each having a ‘home’ island.

== Clubs ==
Location of the represented clubs (islands) in the 2012 A-Division

Club	Island
Amatuku FC	Funafuti
Lakena United	Nanumea
FC Nanumaga	Nanumanga
Nauti FC	Funafuti
Nui FC	Nui
Tofaga FC	Vaitupu
Nukufetau FC	Nukufetau
