= 2021 Tuvalu A-Division =

A-Division
- Season: 2021
- Champions: FC Tofaga
- Matches: 24
- Goals: 136 (5.67 per match)
- Biggest home win: FC Tofaga 16-0 FC Niutao
- Biggest away win: Tamanuku 0-3 FC Tofaga

The 2021 Tuvalu A-Division was the 21st season of top flight association football in Tuvalu. The season started in 6 March and finished on 17 April 2021.

== Tuvalu A-Division competition ==
The competition takes place at the 1,500-capacity Tuvalu Sports Ground in Funafuti, this is the only football field in Tuvalu. The football clubs are based on the communities of the 8 major islands of Tuvalu, with the rivalry between these 8 teams being maintained by each having a ‘home’ island.

== Clubs ==
The 2021 edition of the Tuvalu A-Division was played between 8 teams:

- FC Manu Laeva (Nukulaelae)
- Ha'apai United (Nanumaga)
- FC Niutao (Niutao)
- Tofaga FC (Vaitupu)
- Lakena United (Nanumea)
- Nauti FC (Funafuti)
- Tamanuku (Nukufetau)
- Vaoloa (Nui)

== League table ==
Pos	Team	Pld	W	D	L	GF	GA	GD	Pts
1	FC Tofaga	6	6	0	0	30	4	+26	18
2	Nauti FC	6	4	1	1	13	4	+9	13
3	FC Manu Laeva	6	4	1	1	24	16	+8	13
4	Ha'apai United	6	3	0	3	18	17	+1	9
5	FC Niutao	6	2	1	3	11	29	−18	7
6	Lakena United	6	2	0	4	17	23	−6	6
7	Tamanuku	6	1	0	5	12	19	−7	3
8	Vaoloa	6	0	1	5	11	24	−13	1

Updated to match(es) played on 3 December 2021. Source: RSSSF.com
Rules for classification: 1) Points; 2) Goal difference; 3) Goals scored

== Results ==
=== Round 1 ===
Matches for round 1 were held on March 6:

Niutao - Tamanuku
Nauti 0-1 Tofaga
Lakena United - Vaoloa
Ha'apai - Manu Laeva

=== Round 2 ===
Matches for round 1 were held on March 13:

Ha'apai - Tamanuku
Manu Laeva - Vaoloa
Nauti - Niutao
Lakena United 1-4 Tofaga

=== Round 3 ===
Matches for round 1 were held on March 20:

Nauti - Lakena United
Ha'apai - Niutao
Manu Laeva 1-2 Tofaga
Vaoloa - Tamanuku

=== Round 4 ===
Matches for round 1 were held on March 27:

Vaoloa - Niutao
Tamanuku 0-3 Tofaga
Nauti - Ha'apai
Manu Laeva - Lakena United

=== Round 5 ===
Matches for round 1 were held on April 3:

Nauti - Manu Laeva
Vaoloa - Ha'apai
Tamanuku - Lakena United
Tofaga 16-0 Niutao

=== Round 6 ===
Matches for round 1 were held on April 10:

Tofaga 4-2 Ha'apai
Niutao - Lakena United
Tamanuku - Manu Laeva
Nauti - Vaoloa

=== Round 7 ===
Matches for round 1 were held on April 17:

Nauti - Tamanuku
Tofaga 6-0 Vaoloa
Lakena United - Ha'apai
Niutao - Manu Laeva
