= 2009 Tuvalu A-Division =

A-Division
- Season: 2009
- Champions: Nauti FC

The 2009 Tuvalu A-Division was the ninth season of association football competition. The Tuvalu A-Division was won by Nauti FC for the third consecutive time and the fourth time overall. The league was renamed for the fourth consecutive season, this time being called the Funafuti League.

== Participating teams ==
- Amatuku FC
- F.C. Nanumaga
- Lakena United
- Nauti FC
- Nukufetau FC
- Tofaga FC

== Tuvalu A-Division competition ==
The competition takes place at the 1,500-capacity Tuvalu Sports Ground in Funafuti, this is the only football field in Tuvalu. The football clubs are based on the communities of the 8 major islands of Tuvalu, with the rivalry between these 8 teams being maintained by each having a ‘home’ island.
