= 2013 Tuvalu A-Division =

A-Division
- Season: 2013
- Champions: Nauti A
- Matches: 15
- Goals: 50 (3.33 per match)
- Top goalscorer: Mase Tumua (4)
- Highest scoring: Tofaga A 10–0 Tamanuku A (10 goals)

The 2013 Tuvalu A-Division was the 13th season of top flight association football in Tuvalu. The Tuvalu A-Division season started on 9 March 2013 and finished on 6 April 2013. The champions were Nauti FC who won their eighth league title.

== Tuvalu A-Division competition ==
The competition takes place at the 1,500-capacity Tuvalu Sports Ground in Funafuti, this is the only football field in Tuvalu. The football clubs are based on the communities of the 8 major islands of Tuvalu, with the rivalry between these 8 teams being maintained by each having a ‘home’ island.

== Clubs ==
Location of the represented clubs (islands) in the 2013 A-Division

Club	Island
Lakena United A	Nanumea
Manu Laeva A	Nukulaelae
Ha'apai United A	Nanumanga
Nauti A	Funafuti
Tamanuku A	Nukufetau
Tofaga A	Vaitupu

== Standings ==
Pos	Team	Pld	W	D	L	GF	GA	GD	Pts
1	Nauti A	5	4	1	0	9	3	+6	13
2	Tofaga A	5	3	2	0	16	3	+13	11
3	Ha'apai United A	5	2	1	2	8	7	+1	7
4	Manu Laeva A	5	2	0	3	9	10	−1	6
5	Lakena United A	5	1	1	3	5	9	−4	4
6	Tamanuku A	5	0	1	4	3	17	−14	1

Updated to match(es) played on 9 March 2013. Source:
Rules for classification: 1) points; 2) goal difference; 3) number of goals scored.

== Round 1 ==
9 March 2013
11:00

Nauti A	4–1	Manu Laeva A
Mase Tumua; Afelee Valoa; Siu Teagai	Report	Tafalagi Mataio

Tuvalu Sports Ground, Funafuti
Referee: Vailine

9 March 2013
12:45

Lakena United A	2–1	Ha'apai United A
Ioane Haulagi; Kanava Makuli	Report	Alofagia Sualo

Tuvalu Sports Ground, Funafuti
Referee: Fiaga Lusama

9 March 2013
14:30

Tofaga A	10–0	Tamanuku A
Lutelu Tiute; Reme Timuani; Etimani Maio; Ben Petaia; Lawerance Nemia; Paitela Kelemene; James Lepaio	Report

Tuvalu Sports Ground, Funafuti
Referee: Laupula Huehe

== Round 2 ==
16 March 2013
8:00

Tofaga A	2–2	Ha'apai United A
James Lepaio	Report	Amatusi Telogo; Alofagia Sualo (o.g.)

Tuvalu Sports Ground, Funafuti
Referee: Fiaga Lusama

16 March 2013
9:45

Manu Laeva A	2–1	Tamanuku A
Sialee Suamlie; Akelei Lima'alofa	Report	Felo Feoto

Tuvalu Sports Ground, Funafuti
Referee: Laupula Huehe

16 March 2013
11:30

Nauti A	2–1	Lakena United A
Sosene Vailine; Mase Tumua	Report	Setu Taimanuga

Tuvalu Sports Ground, Funafuti
Referee: Molesi Valoaga

== Round 3 ==
23 March 2013
8:00

Lakena United A	2–2	Tamanuku A
Poukanava Taimanuga; Ioane Haumili	Report	Felo Feoto; Talavalu Lipua

Tuvalu Sports Ground, Funafuti
Referee: Patoa Lauti

23 March 2013
9:45

Tofaga A	3–1	Manu Laeva A
Eric Tealofi; Reme Timuani	Report	Suega Tonise

Tuvalu Sports Ground, Funafuti
Referee: Laupula Huehe

23 March 2013
11:30

Nauti A	2–1	Ha'apai United A
Mase Tumua; Sili Fakasega	Report	Taupo Pelita

Tuvalu Sports Ground, Funafuti
Referee: Fiaga Lusama

== Round 4 ==
30 March 2013
8:00

Tofaga A	1–0	Lakena United A
Malakai Alesana	Report

Tuvalu Sports Ground, Funafuti
Referee: Patoa Lauti

30 March 2013
9:45

Nauti A	1–0	Tamanuku A
Taufaiva Andrew	Report

Tuvalu Sports Ground, Funafuti
Referee: Fiaga Lusama

30 March 2013
11:30

Manu Laeva A	1–2	Ha'apai United A
Tukai Vaega	Report	Sepuli Loaha

Tuvalu Sports Ground, Funafuti
Referee: Vailine

== Round 5 ==
6 April 2013
8:00

Ha'apai United A	2–0	Tamanuku A
Tusia Pasama; Taupo Pelita	Report

Tuvalu Sports Ground, Funafuti
Referee: Laupula Huehe

6 April 2013
9:45

Nauti A	0–0	Tofaga A
	Report

Tuvalu Sports Ground, Funafuti
Referee: Fiaga Lusama

6 April 2013
11:30

Lakena United A	0–4	Manu Laeva A
	Report	Tofiga Tinilau; Akelei Lima'alofa; Suega Tonise

Tuvalu Sports Ground, Funafuti
Referee: Patoa Lauti

== Top goalscorers ==
Pos.	Player	Club	Goals
1	(Tuvalu) Mase Tumua	Nauti A	4
2	(Tuvalu) James Lepaio	Tofaga A	3
3	(Tuvalu) Reme Timuani	Tofaga A	3
4	(Tuvalu) Lutelu Tiute	Tofaga A	2
5	(Tuvalu) Etimani Maio	Tofaga A	2
6	(Tuvalu) Felo Feoto	Tamanuku A	2
7	(Tuvalu) Akelei Lima'alofa	Manu Laeva A	2
8	(Tuvalu) Sepuli Loaha	Ha'apai United A	2
9	(Tuvalu) Tofiga Tinilau	Manu Laeva A	2
10	(Tuvalu) Eric Tealofi	Tofaga A	2

=== Awards ===
==== Best Player ====
The best player for the tournament was Eric Tealofi of FC Tofaga.
