= 2023 Tuvalu A-Division =

A-Division
- Season: 2023
- Dates: 17 March 2023 – 15 April 2023
- Champions: Nauti
- Matches: 15
- Goals: 79 (5.27 per match)
- Biggest home win: Nauti 6–0 Manu Laeva (15 March 2023)
- Biggest away win: Tamanuku 0–3 Ha'apai United (1 April 2023)

The 2023 Tuvalu A-Division was the 21st season of top flight association football in Tuvalu. The season started in 17 March and finished on 15 April 2023.

== Teams and locations ==
Team	Location	2021 position
Ha'apai United	Nanumanga	4th
Nauti	Funafuti	2nd
Manu Laeva	Nukulaelae	3rd
Tamanuku	Nukufetau	7th
Tofaga	Vaitupu	1st
Vaoloa	Nui	8th

=== Clubs that did not register ===
There are 2 clubs that did not register for the 2023 season. This included Lakena United and Niutao.

== League table ==
Pos	Team	Pld	W	D	L	GF	GA	GD	Pts
1	Nauti (C)	5	3	1	1	13	5	+8	10
2	Tofaga	5	2	3	0	12	7	+5	9
3	Vaoloa	5	2	1	2	16	14	+2	7
4	Ha'apai United	5	2	0	3	14	16	−2	6
5	Manu Laeva	5	2	0	3	14	22	−8	6
6	Tamanuku	5	1	1	3	10	15	−5	4

Rules for classification: 1) Points; 2) Head-to-head points; 3) Head-to-head goal difference; 4) Head-to-head goals scored; 5) Goal difference; 6) Goals scored
(C) Champions

== Results ==
Home \ Away	HAP	MAU	NAU	TAM	TOF	VAO
Ha'apai United		5–6				5–4
Manu Laeva				3–1	3–6	
Nauti	3–1	6–0		2–3		
Tamanuku		1–3			1–1	4–6
Tofaga	2–0		1–1			2–2
Vaoloa		4–2	0–1			

Source: https://www.rsssf.org/tablest/tuvalu2023.html
Legend: Blue = home team win; Yellow = draw; Red = away team win.
