= 2026 Tuvalu A-Division =

2026 TNPF League
- Season: 2026
- Dates: 7 March 2026 – 9 May 2026
- Champions: Nauti
- Matches: 21
- Best player: Luka ??? Lakena
- Top goalscorer: Andrew Pelekata (Nauti); Aimasu Sio (Tamanuku)
- Biggest home win: Nauti 12–0 Destroyer (7 March 2026)
- Biggest away win: Destroyer 0–12 Nauti (7 March 2026)
- Highest scoring: Destroyer 0–12 Nauti (7 March 2026)

The 2026 Tuvalu A-Division was the 24th season of top-flight association football in Tuvalu. The competition was sponsored by the Tuvalu National Provident Fund (TNPF) and was contested by seven teams. The season began on 7 March 2026 and concluded in May 2026, with Nauti winning the championship.

== Teams and locations ==
Location of the represented clubs (islands) in the 2026 A-Division season.

Team	Location	Notes
Nauti	Funafuti	
Lakena	Nanumea	Also known as Nanumea
Tamanuku	Nukufetau	
Tofaga	Vaitupu	
Manu Laeva	Nukulaelae	
Ha'apai	Nanumanga	Also known as Nanumaga
Destroyer	Niutao	Also known as Niutao

== League table ==
Pos	Team	Pld	W	D	L	GD	Pts
1	Nauti (C)	6	6	0	0	+36	18
2	Lakena	6	4	0	2	+5	12
3	Tamanuku	6	3	1	2	−4	10
4	Tofaga	6	2	1	3	0	7
5	Manu Laeva	6	2	1	3	−5	7
6	Ha'apai	6	1	2	3	−4	5
7	Destroyer	6	0	1	5	−28	1

Rules for classification: 1) Points; 2) Goal difference; 3) Goals scored
(C) Champions

== Results ==
Home \ Away	DES	HAP	LAK	MAU	NAU	TAM	TOF
Destroyer		0–3					
Ha'apai							1–3
Lakena	4–1	3–2					
Manu Laeva	win	4–4	3–6				win
Nauti	12–0	win	win	5–1		12–0	4–0
Tamanuku	6–1	draw	win	win			1–3
Tofaga	draw		2–3				

Legend: Blue = home team win; Yellow = draw; Red = away team win.
