= Football in Tuvalu =

- Country: Tuvalu
- Governing body: Tuvalu Islands Football Association
- National team: Tuvalu
- Clubs: 8

Association football is the most popular sport in Tuvalu. Football in Tuvalu is governed by the Tuvalu National Football Association (TNFA). The TNFA became an associate member association of the Oceania Football Confederation (OFC) on 15 November 2006 with a further reinstatement on 16 March 2020. The TNFA has been wanting to become a full member of the OFC and a member of FIFA since 1987.

== History of the sport ==
The earliest records of football in Tuvalu date back to the 1979 South Pacific Games where Tuvalu competed. They defeated Tonga, but lost their other two matches. This qualified them for a play-off against Kiribati, which they would win on penalties before losing to Guam national football team. A league was active by 1980, with Nauti FC being founded in that year, and it would continue until 1991 when renovations prevented access to the airstrip for training or the Tuvalu Sports Ground for matches. It would reform in 1998 and has so far lasted to the current day. The women's league would form in 2009, though this would prove to be more sporadic and there is less evidence for it. In the modern era the men's league typically includes clubs from all the main islands, with A and B divisions, along with 2nd teams from the larger clubs. The women's league, in contrast, is much smaller, with only a handful of clubs participating. Typically the leagues are formatted as a group stage, either a single group of up to 8 teams or 2 separate groups of up to 4 teams. Then teams qualify for a semi-final and a final to determine the champions for that year.

Additionally, with league seasons being short, there are multiple competitions per year. In the modern era a typical year contains the league, the NBT Cup and at least one of a handful of other competitions such as: the Tuvalu Games (from 2008 to 2017), the Independence Cup (where teams compete under their island's name), the Christmas Cup and more. The ministry of education, youth and sports have also organised tournaments and a men's C-Division was formed in the 2022 NBT Cup for veteran's football. Otherwise the same clubs compete, though results can vary a little more. These tournaments are typically organised for both genders, though sometimes there have been insufficient teams for a women's division.

In international sport, they wouldn't return until the 2003 South Pacific Games, where a narrow 3–2 victory over Kiribati would prove to be their only victory from 4 matches. Otherwise they would lose 1–0 to Vanuatu and 4–0 to each the Solomon Islands and Fiji.

History was made in 2007 when Tuvalu became the first non FIFA member to participate in an official World Cup qualifying match. The situation arose when the regional governing body used the 2007 South Pacific Games, as the first stage of the qualification tournament for the 2010 FIFA World Cup and qualification tournament for the 2008 OFC Nations Cup. Tuvalu performed with great credit, earning a remarkable 1–1 draw with Tahiti in which Viliamu Sekifu became as the first World cup scorer for his country. The other three fixtures in the tournament ended in defeat and Tuvalu failed to progress from their five team group.

In September 2008, Tuvaluan Prime Minister Apisai Ielemia and the President of the Tuvalu Football Association, Tapugao Falefou, visited the headquarters of FIFA in Zurich, hoping to gain full membership in the organisation. However the lack of football facilities in Tuvalu is a major obstacle for membership of FIFA. Tuvalu only has one stadium, and it does not have training grounds or hotels for visiting teams and supporters.

In recent years, the TNFA have received support from the Netherlands. In 2011 Foppe de Haan was the football coach of Tuvalu for the 2011 Pacific Games. They would perform well, but would not return for the 2015 edition. On 1 May 2012 Stevan de Geijter was appointed as the head of Youth Development at the TNFA. The Tuvalu national football team and the activities of the Dutch Support Tuvalu Foundation are the focus of Mission Tuvalu (Missie Tuvalu) (2013) a feature documentary directed by Jeroen van den Kroonenberg, in which the route for Tuvalu's FIFA membership is shown.

Football continues to strengthen on the islands to this day, with regular league action and international action including victories at the 2017 Pacific Mini Games, overseas action at the 2018 CONIFA World Football Cup and a further draw against full FIFA member American Samoa at the 2019 Pacific Games.

== National competitions ==
- Men's A-Division
- Men's B-Division
- Men's C-Division (played in 2022 only)
- Women's A-Division
- Independence Cup (both genders)
- NBT Cup (both genders)
- Tuvalu Games
- Christmas Cup

== National teams ==
=== Men's team ===
The Tuvalu national football team debuted in 1979 and has appeared sporadically since. Exclusion from the Oceania Football Confederation and FIFA has meant that iopportunities to play are limited and therefore they have mainly played in the Pacific Games to date. they have played in 2003, 2007, 2011, 2017 and 2019 to date. Results against sides from the preliminary round of the OFC's World Cup qualifiers have generally been competitive, showcasing the possible talent of the islands, though as with such sides, results against the more established nations have mainly been comfortable defeats.

=== Women's team ===
The TIFA formed a women's national team in 2012, along with the Women's A-Division, as a step toward meeting requirements for FIFA membership. The association hoped for the team to debut in international competition in 2013 or 2014. As of 2026, the team has not played an international match.

=== U-17 team ===
In August 2012 they participated for the first time on a tournament. They participated at the NBT Cup for B-teams. The first game they won against Ha’apai United B with 3–0. But they lost the second game with 6–0 against TMTI and the third game they lost with 5–0 against Lofeagai Boys. Malesi of Lofeagai scored 5 goals.

=== Other national teams ===
A futsal national team have also competed, participating at the 2008 Oceanian Futsal Championship, 2010 Oceanian Futsal Championship and 2011 Oceanian Futsal Championship, though they would lose every game, often coming up against significantly more experienced opposition.

== Tuvaluan clubs ==
The number of participating clubs varies by tournament, with the larger islands often sending second or even third teams to compete. These typically play in the B-Division, though 2nd squads have played in the A-Division previously. Some clubs have only competed in the women's division. The main club is Nauti FC, who regularly win titles and compete across all divisions.

Club	Island
Lakena United	Nanumea
Manu Laeva	Nukulaelae
FC Ha'apai United	Nanumanga
Nauti	Funafuti
Tamanuku	Nukufetau
Tofaga	Vaitupu
Vaoloa	Nui
Niutao	Niutao
Pukapili	Funafuti
Kaumaile	Unknown
Moagale	Unknown
Taumeana	Unknown

== National football stadium ==
Stadium	Capacity	City
Tuvalu Sports Ground	1,500	Funafuti

== Tuvaluan footballers abroad ==
Several Tuvaluan footballers have played for clubs in New Zealand:

- Vaisua Liva and Alopua Petoa joined Waitakere City in 2012.
- Meneua Fakasega and Jerome Funafuti also played for Waitakere City.
- Maalosi Alefaio and Sepetaio Nokisi have played for Te Atatu.
- Jason Alama has played for West Coast Rangers.
- Falaima Mokeni has played for North Wellington.
- Yvan Sapele has played for Wainuiomata.

Tulimanu Lisati has played for Stormbirds SC, in Alice Springs, Northern Territory, Australia.
