= Tuvalu B-Division =

Second tier of the football league system in Tuvalu

- Country: Tuvalu
- Level on pyramid: 2
- Current champions: Ha'apai FC (2026)

The Tuvalu B-Division is the second-tier league of football in Tuvalu, operating under the auspices of the Tuvalu Islands Football Association. The reserve sides of Tuvalu A-Division clubs compete in the league, in addition to several independent clubs. There is no promotion and relegation between the A-Division and B-Division.

== Known champions ==
Season	Champion	Ref.
2020	Tamanuku B	
2021	Tofaga B	
2023	Lakena B1	
2024	Niutao B	
2026	Ha'apai	

== See also ==
- Football in Tuvalu
