= 2004 Tuvalu A-Division =

A-Division
- Season: 2004
- Champions: Lakena United

The 2004 season of the Tuvalu A-Division was the fourth season of association football competition. The champions of the Tuvalu A-Division were Lakena United, their first title and the first time the league was won by a team other than F.C. Niutao.

== Tuvalu A-Division competition ==
The competition takes place at the 1,500-capacity Tuvalu Sports Ground in Funafuti, this is the only soccer field in Tuvalu. The football clubs are based on the communities of the 8 major islands of Tuvalu, with the rivalry between these 8 teams being maintained by each having a ‘home’ island.
