= 2017 Tuvalu A-Division =

A-Division
- Season: 2017
- Champions: FC Manu Laeva

The 2017 Tuvalu A-Division was the 17th season of top flight association football in Tuvalu. The season started and finish on 2017.

This seventeenth edition of the Tuvalu A-Division marked the end of the Nauti FC title streak, which in 2016 totaled 10 consecutive titles and 11 in total. In addition to the 11 Tuvalu A-Division titles, the Nauti FC team had previously won the Tuvalu League Tournament 11 other times (national league predecessor to the Tuvalu A-Division).

== Tuvalu A-Division competition ==
The competition takes place at the 1,500-capacity Tuvalu Sports Ground in Funafuti, this is the only football field in Tuvalu. The football clubs are based on the communities of the 8 major islands of Tuvalu, with the rivalry between these 8 teams being maintained by each having a ‘home’ island.
