= 2006 Tuvalu A-Division =

A-Division
- Season: 2006
- Champions: Lakena United
- Top goalscorer: Kivoli Tehulu

The 2006 Tuvalu A-Division was the sixth season of association football competition. the Tuvalu A-Division was won by Lakena United for the second time. the format of the league was changed for this season, rather than a single division, the teams were split into two pools, the winners of each pool then played each other in a single leg final to determine the champion. Kivoli Tehulu was the season's top scorer and Paueli Hemanaia won the player of the year award.

== Tuvalu A-Division competition ==
The competition takes place at the 1,500-capacity Tuvalu Sports Ground in Funafuti, this is the only soccer field in Tuvalu. The football clubs are based on the communities of the 8 major islands of Tuvalu, with the rivalry between these 8 teams being maintained by each having a ‘home’ island.

== Pool stage ==
Pool 1 was won by Lakena United A, whilst Pool B was won by Nukufetau A.

== Championship game ==
Lakena United beat Nukufetau to win their second national championship.

August 28, 2006?

Lakena United A	Beat	Nukufetau A
	Source
