= 2008 Tuvalu A-Division =

A-Division
- Season: 2008
- Champions: Nauti FC

The 2008 Tuvalu A-Division was the eighth season of association football competition. The Tuvalu A-Division was won by Nauti FC for the second consecutive time and the third time overall. The league, containing 9 participating teams, which ran between February and October, was renamed, Premier League, having been called TNPF Soccer League the previous season.

== Tuvalu A-Division competition ==
The competition takes place at the 1,500-capacity Tuvalu Sports Ground in Funafuti, this is the only football field in Tuvalu. The football clubs are based on the communities of the 8 major islands of Tuvalu, with the rivalry between these 8 teams being maintained by each having a ‘home’ island.
