= 2015 Tuvalu A-Division =

A-Division
- Season: 2015
- Champions: Nauti A

The 2015 Tuvalu A-Division was the 15th season of top flight association football in Tuvalu. The Tuvalu A-Division season started and finish on 2015.

== Tuvalu A-Division competition ==
The competition takes place at the 1,500-capacity Tuvalu Sports Ground in Funafuti, this is the only football field in Tuvalu. The football clubs are based on the communities of the 8 major islands of Tuvalu, with the rivalry between these 8 teams being maintained by each having a ‘home’ island.
