= 2007 Tuvalu A-Division =

A-Division
- Season: 2007
- Champions: Nauti FC

The 2007 Tuvalu A-Division was the seventh season of association football competition. The Tuvalu A-Division was won by Nauti FC for the second time. the league returned to the single division format from the two pool format with a play-off used in the previous season. The league, which started on 17 February, was renamed, TNPF Soccer League.

== Tuvalu A-Division competition ==
The competition takes place at the 1,500-capacity Tuvalu Sports Ground in Funafuti, this is the only soccer field in Tuvalu. The football clubs are based on the communities of the 8 major islands of Tuvalu, with the rivalry between these 8 teams being maintained by each having a ‘home’ island.
