= Tuvalu Wellington FC =

- Nickname: TU8 Welly FC
- Founded: 2018
- Ground: Ascot Park Reserve
- Chairman: Martin Manulele
- Manager: Soteria Fusi
- League: WBF Division 3
- 2026: 5th
- Website: Website
Home colours

Tuvalu Wellington FC, also known as TU8 Welly FC or Tuvalu FC is a New Zealand football club located in Porirua, Wellington. They play in the Wellington Better Football Division 3, an amateur league for Wellington based clubs that is not part of the New Zealand football league system. They are known to have 7-a-side and 11-a-side teams.

They are a Tuvaluan diaspora football team.

== Current squad ==
Note: Flags indicate national team as defined under FIFA eligibility rules; some limited exceptions apply. Players may hold more than one non-FIFA nationality.

No.	Pos.	Nation	Player
—	GK	TUV	Teleke Filiga
—	DF	TUV	Tamiloga Puka
—	DF	TUV	Mose Tausi
—	DF	TUV	Nabuu Vaelei
—	DF	TUV	Watkin K Tefaiva
—	DF	NZL	Habibi Baraka
—	MF	TUV	Tabokai Tausi
—	MF	TUV	Panapa Panapa
—	MF	TUV	Erika Amuia
—	MF	TUV	Yvan Sapele (captain)

No.	Pos.	Nation	Player
—	FW	TUV	Soapi Lupi
—	FW	TUV	Martin Manulele
—	MF	TUV	Toafa Tealei
—	FW	TUV	Tofikai Eti
—	FW	TUV	Mauga Mallon
—	FW	TUV	Mau Tealei
—	FW	TUV	Olomalu Mausali
—		TUV	Tautuu Tautuu
—		TUV	Sualiki Toff
—		TUV	Tiliga Smith
