= Tuvalu A-Division =

- Founded: 1980; 46 years ago
- Country: Tuvalu
- Confederation: OFC
- Number of clubs: 8
- Level on pyramid: 1
- Domestic cup(s): NBT Cup; Independence Cup; Christmas Cup; Tuvalu Games
- Current champions: Nauti FC (2023)
- Most championships: Nauti FC (26)
- Current: 2026 Tuvalu A-Division

The Tuvalu A-Division or The National Provident Fund Championship League (NPF) is the top football division in Tuvalu. The league is organised by the Tuvalu National Football Association. Eight of the nine islands in Tuvalu are represented in the league. Niulakita is the only island that has no football club. Matches are held at the 1,500-capacity Tuvalu Sports Ground in Funafuti, the only football field on the main island.

The league was founded in 2001. There is also the Tuvalu B-Division which is composed of reserve squads from each of the A-Division teams as well as several other teams.

A C-Division has also featured occasionally though have only competed in secondary leagues or knockout competitions such as the NBT cup or MEYS (Ministry of Education, Youth and Sports) Cup and mostly featured B and C teams of A-Division sides.

The major titles in Tuvalu are the Independence Cup (held to recognise the independence of Tuvalu), the NBT Cup (sponsored by The National Bank of Tuvalu), the Christmas Cup, and the football competition at the Tuvalu Games.

== Data ==
In June 2026, the TIFA announced that it had entered into a partnership with Koach Hub to build Tuvalu's data infrastructure. This infastructure would include building and maintaining player profiles and league statistics with the goal of increasing player visibility. This increased visibility would make it easier for club's abroad to identify local talent and open up new opportunities for player development.

== Taganoa Cup ==
Teams in the A-division also compete for the Taganoa Cup. No separate matches are played for this trophy. Instead, teams compete concurrently for the trophy during their league matches. For a team to take ownership of the cup, they must defeat the present holders during a league game. They then become the defending holders until they lose a league match themselves. Whichever team is in possession of the trophy at the end of the season is crowned champions. The first Taganoa Cup competition was held in 2021 and was won by FC Tofaga.

== Clubs ==
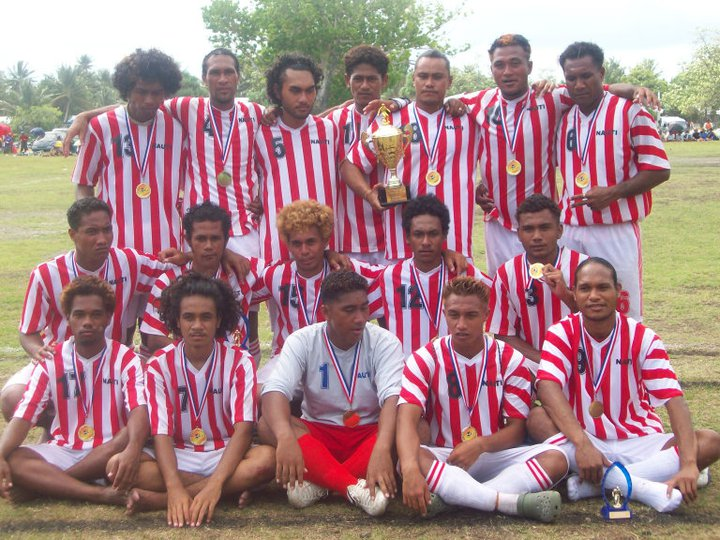
Nauti FC have won the A-Division title more times than every other Tuvaluan team combined

As well as having squads in the Tuvalu B-Division, many A-Division teams also have a women's team which play in the A-Division Women's League and other competitions. In 2019, FC Tofaga and Nauti FC entered an 'A1 and 'A2' team into the A-Division league. Nauti did this again in 2020.

Club	Island
Lakena United	Nanumea
Manu Laeva	Nukulaelae
Nanumaga	Nanumanga
Nauti	Funafuti
Tamanuku	Nukufetau
Tofaga	Vaitupu
Nui	Nui
Niutao	Niutao

== Previous winners ==
Tuvalu League Tournament
Year	Winner	Island
1980	Nauti FC	Funafuti
1981	Nauti FC	Funafuti
1982	Nauti FC	Funafuti
1983	Nauti FC	Funafuti
1984	Nauti FC	Funafuti
1985	Nauti FC	Funafuti
1986	Nauti FC	Funafuti
1987	Nauti FC	Funafuti
1988	Nauti FC	Funafuti
1989	Nauti FC	Funafuti
1990	Nauti FC	Funafuti
1991–1997 not held
1998	Unknown	
1999	Unknown	
2000	Unknown	

Tuvalu A-Division
Year	Winner	Island
2001	FC Niutao	Niutao
2002	FC Niutao	Niutao
2003	FC Niutao	Niutao
2004	Lakena United	Nanumea
2005	Nauti FC	Funafuti
2006	Lakena United	Nanumea
2007	Nauti FC	Funafuti
2008	Nauti FC	Funafuti
2009	Nauti FC	Funafuti
2010	Nauti FC	Funafuti
2011	Nauti FC	Funafuti
2012	Nauti FC	Funafuti
2013	Nauti FC	Funafuti
2014	Nauti FC	Funafuti
2015	Nauti FC	Funafuti
2016	Nauti FC	Funafuti
2017	Manu Laeva	Nukulaelae
2018	Manu Laeva	Nukulaelae
2019	Nauti FC	Funafuti
2020	Nauti FC	Funafuti
2021	F.C. Tofaga	Vaitupu
2022	Nauti FC	Funafuti
2023	Nauti FC	Funafuti
2024	F.C. Tofaga	Vaitupu
2025	Unknown	
2026	Nauti FC	Funafuti

=== Number of wins ===
Wins	Club	Winning Year(s)
27	Nauti FC	2005, 2007, 2008, 2009, 2010, 2011, 2012, 2013, 2014, 2015, 2016, 2019, 2020, 2022, 2023, 2026
3	FC Niutao	2001, 2002, 2003
2	Lakena United	2004, 2006
2	FC Manu Laeva	2017, 2018
2	F.C. Tofaga	2021, 2024

== Goalscorer statistics ==
=== Top goalscorers ===
Pos.	Player	Goals
1	(Tuvalu) James Lepaio	30
2	(Tuvalu) Alopua Petoa	19

=== Top goalscorers by season ===
Season	Player	Team	Goals
2011	(Tuvalu) Starzle	Manu Laeva	6
2011	(Tuvalu) Siopepa Tailolo	Lakena United	6
2011	(Tuvalu) Lutelu Tiute	Tofaga	6
2012	(Tuvalu) Alopua Petoa	Tofaga	10
2013	(Tuvalu) Mase Tumua	Nauti	4
2019	(Tuvalu) James Lepaio	Tofaga	15
2020	(Tuvalu) Hosea Sente	Nauti	8
2021	(Tuvalu) Alopua Petoa	Tofaga	5
2021	(Tuvalu) James Lepaio	Tofaga	5

=== Multiple hat-tricks ===
Key
^{(4)}	Player scored 4 goals
^{(5)}	Player scored 5 goals
^{(6)}	Player scored 6 goals

Note: The source of the following information (rsssf.com) does not state goalscorers in some seasons. Therefore, this list is almost certainly not exhaustive.

Player	For	Against	Score	Date	Ref.
Matakai Alesana^{(4)}	Tofaga	Nui	4–1	4 February 2012	
Alopua Petoa^{(4)}	Tofaga	Lakena United	6–0	3 March 2012	
Alopua Petoa^{(6)}	Tofaga	Niutao	7–1	17 March 2012	
Tupou	Manu Laeva	Nauti A2	4-1	20 April 2019	
Meauma Petaia^{(4)}	Tamanuku	Niutao	5-3	20 April 2019	
Eliata	Lakena United	Tofaga A2	1-13	20 April 2019	
Alopua Petoa^{(4)}	Tofaga	Nui	0–24	9 May 2020	
Eric Tealofi	Tofaga	Nui	0–24	9 May 2020	
Sueni Founuku^{(4)}	Tofaga	Nui	0–24	9 May 2020	
James Lepaio^{(5)}	Tofaga	Nui	0–24	9 May 2020	
Fata Filemoni	Tofaga	Nui	0–24	9 May 2020	
Katepu Iosua	Tofaga	Nui	0–24	9 May 2020	
Felo Feoto	Tamanuku	Nanumaga	2–6	16 May 2020	
Nathan Josh	Nauti	Nui FC	10–0	16 May 2020	
Hosea Sente^{(4)}	Nauti	Nui FC	10–0	16 May 2020	
Alopua Petoa^{(5)}	Tofaga	Niutao	16-0	3 April 2021	
James Lepaio^{(5)}	Tofaga	Niutao	16-0	3 April 2021	
