= Alopua Petoa =

Tuvaluan footballer (born 1990)

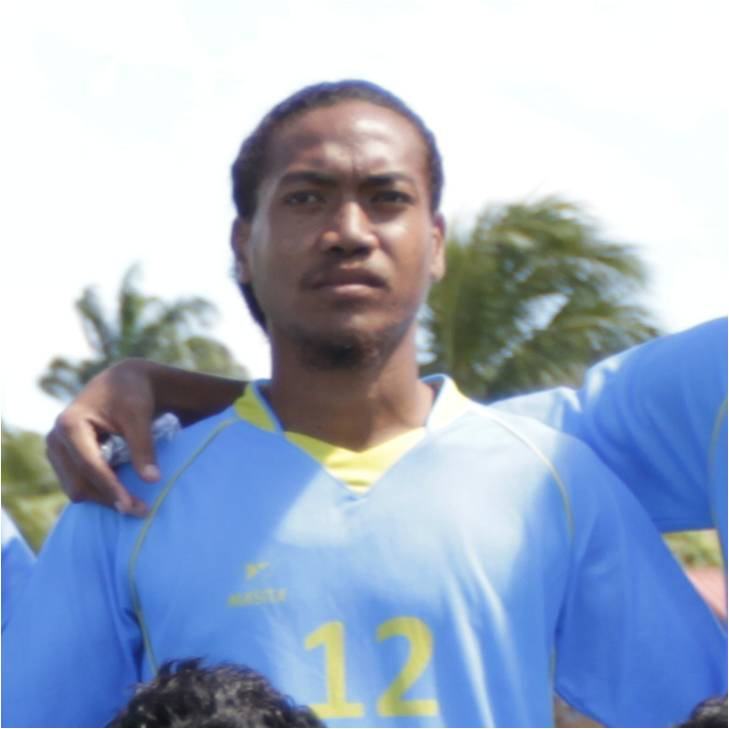
- Petoa lining up for Tuvalu in 2011

Personal information
- Date of birth: 24 January 1990 (age 36)
- Place of birth: Nauru
- Position: Forward

Team information
- Current team: Tofaga

Senior career*
Years	Team	Apps	(Gls)
2005–2012	Tofaga	22+	(32+)
2012	Brabantia		
2013–2014	Waitakere City		
2014–2018	Tofaga		
2019	Nanumaga		
2020–	Tofaga		(9+)

International career
2011–2019	Tuvalu	13	(9)
- * Club domestic league appearances and goals

Alopua Petoa (born 24 January 1990) is a footballer who plays as a forward for FC Tofaga. Born in Nauru, he represented the Tuvalu national team and is their all-time top scorer.

== Early life ==
Born in Nauru, Petoa started playing football at the age of ten before becoming a naturalized Tuvalu citizen and joining Vatokami in 2005 which would change its name to FC Tofaga the same year.

== Club career ==
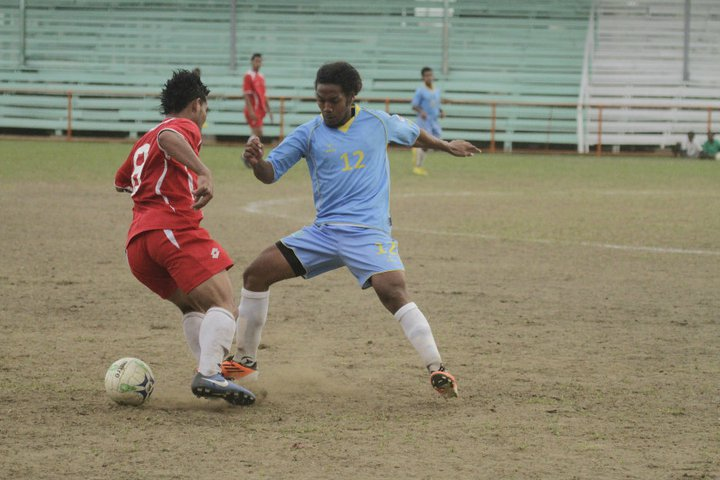
Petoa with Tuvalu in 2011

Alopua Petoa was the top scorer in the Tuvalu A-Division competition in 2012 and joint top scorer with James Lepaio in 2021.

In 2012, Petoa was discovered by Dutch manager Foppe de Haan and signed for Dutch side Brabantia along with Vaisua Liva, initially training with their reserve team.

In 2013, he signed for New Zealand side Waitakere City with Vaisua Liva, becoming the first professional Tuvaluan players in history.

== International career ==
Petoa has been regarded as one of the best players in Tuvalu and is the all-time top scorer of the Tuvalu national team.

On 22 August 2011, Petoa debuted for the Tuvalu national team during a 3–0 win over Samoa, scoring a hat-trick in what was Tuvalu's first international match in four years and their highest victory in history.

In 2013 Petoa was called for a tour with Tuvalu football Team that took place in the Netherlands where he scored.

On 8 June 2018 at the CONIFA World Football Cup in London, Petoa scored two goals, putting Tuvalu ahead of Tamil Eelam, only for their opponents to stage a dramatic comeback in stoppage time to win 4–3.

== Style of play ==
Petoa mainly operates as a striker and is known for his dribbling.

== Personal life ==
Petoa had not been in a plane until he arrived in the Netherlands to sign for Dutch side Brabantia.

== Career statistics ==
=== International ===
As of match played 18 July 2019.

Appearances and goals by national team and year
National team	Year	Apps	Goals
Tuvalu	2011	5	6
Tuvalu	2012	0	0
Tuvalu	2013	0	0
Tuvalu	2014	0	0
Tuvalu	2015	0	0
Tuvalu	2016	0	0
Tuvalu	2017	5	2
Tuvalu	2018	0	0
Tuvalu	2019	3	1
Total		13	9

Scores and results list Tuvalu's goal tally first, score column indicates score after each Petoa goal.

List of international goals scored by Alopua Petoa
No.	Date	Venue	Opponent	Score	Result	Competition
1	22 August 2011	Ratu Cakobau Park, Nausori, Fiji	Samoa	1–0	3–0	Friendly
2	22 August 2011	Ratu Cakobau Park, Nausori, Fiji	Samoa	2–0	3–0	Friendly
3	22 August 2011	Ratu Cakobau Park, Nausori, Fiji	Samoa	3–0	3–0	Friendly
4	27 August 2011	Stade Rivière Salée, Nouméa, New Caledonia	American Samoa	1–0	4–0	2011 Pacific Games
5	27 August 2011	Stade Rivière Salée, Nouméa, New Caledonia	American Samoa	3–0	4–0	2011 Pacific Games
6	27 August 2011	Stade Rivière Salée, Nouméa, New Caledonia	American Samoa	4–0	4–0	2011 Pacific Games
7	5 December 2017	Korman Stadium, Port Vila, Vanuatu	New Caledonia	2–0	2–1	2017 Pacific Mini Games
8	15 December 2017	Port Vila Municipal Stadium, Port Vila, Vanuatu	Tonga	3–3	4–3	2017 Pacific Mini Games
9	12 July 2019	National Soccer Stadium, Apia, Samoa	American Samoa	1–0	1–1	2019 Pacific Games

CONIFA goals

No.	Date	Venue	Opponent	Score	Result	Competition
1	7 June 2018	Gander Green Lane, Sutton, England	Tamil Eelam	1–0	3–4	2018 CONIFA World Football Cup
2	7 June 2018	Gander Green Lane, Sutton, England	Tamil Eelam	3–1	3–4	2018 CONIFA World Football Cup
