= Nauti F.C. =

Nauti FC
- Full name: Nauti Football Club
- Founded: 1980; 46 years ago
- Ground: Tuvalu Sports Ground, Funafuti, Tuvalu
- Capacity: 1,500
- Chairman: Patoa Lauti
- Coach: Aso Tapumanaia
- League: Tuvalu A-Division
- 2026: Champions
Home colours

Nauti FC is a Tuvalu football club from Funafuti, playing in the Tuvalu A-Division.

The team's home ground is the Tuvalu Sports Ground, the only football field in Tuvalu. Nauti is one of the most successful teams in Tuvalu, with the most trophies of all the nation's teams. Nauti plays on an amateur level, as do all the teams in Tuvalu. They also have a reserve squad and a women's team.

== History ==
Nauti was founded in 1980, under the name Combined Devils. The name was initiated by Mr Igatia Talesi. In 1976, he started a mixed team of men from Funafuti and other Tuvalu Islands with the name Combined Devils.

It was in 1980, that Nauti/Combined Devils was officially recognised as the Funafuti Soccer Team. The team's first red uniform was sponsored by Kamuta Latasi. Years later, the team is still using the red color uniforms, the patterns varies but remains red and white. In 2001 the name of the team was changed into Nauti FC.

Nauti won the independence Cup in 1988, it was the first prize won by the team and also in 1990, 1999, 2003, 2008, 2009 & 2017. Nauti’s 7 wins makes it the most successful team in the Independence Cup competition.

During 1980–1990 the team was never defeated by Vaitupu, Nukulaelae, Nanumaga, Nui or the Tuvalu police Team. It was only defeated once by Nukufetau (penalty kicks in 1982) once by Nanumea and once by Niutao (Knock out tournaments). In the League Tournament Nauti was never defeated in the period 1980–1990.

In 1991 the airfield was tar-sealed and soccer tournaments in the capital Funafuti came to a standstill. Soccer games were first played again in 1997.

Nauti is the most successful club in Tuvalu, having won the most titles in the Tuvalu A-Division of all the teams in Tuvalu. The Tuvalu A-Division was formed in 2001. Nauti won their first A-Division title in 2005. From 2007 on they won the league seven times in a row. 2009 was the most successful year for Nauti FC, winning a total of three trophies.

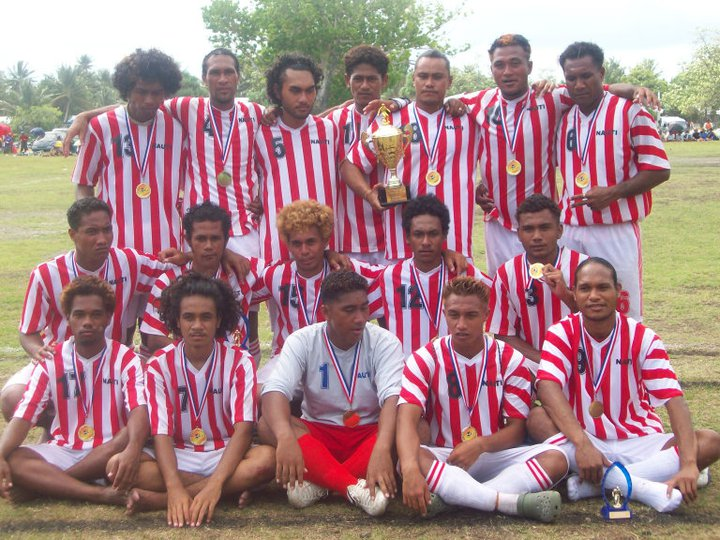
Nauti FC squad in 2011

== Current squad ==
Note: Flags indicate national team as defined under FIFA eligibility rules; some limited exceptions apply. Players may hold more than one non-FIFA nationality.

No.	Pos.	Nation	Player
1	GK	TUV	Jay Timo (vice-captain)
2	DF	TUV	Taulau Loto
3	DF	TUV	Puleuta Satalaka
4	MF	TUV	Tapeni Letueti
5	DF	TUV	Kalamelu Papamau
6	DF	TUV	Paulo Satalaka
7	MF	TUV	Sosene Vailine
8	FW	TUV	Sili Fakasega
9	MF	TUV	Paulo Loto
10	MF	TUV	Jeff Logo

No.	Pos.	Nation	Player
11	FW	TUV	Taufaiva Ionatana
12	FW	TUV	Feleti Sente
13	MF	TUV	Afele Valoa (captain)
14	FW	TUV	Jeff Iefata
15	DF	TUV	John Tevesi
16	MF	TUV	Maleko Heiloa
17	DF	TUV	Katesa Pole
18	DF	TUV	Manao Manao

== International competition ==
Nauti FC was set to participate in 2008–09 OFC Champions League qualification and become the first Tuvaluan club to participate in the tournament. However, the club withdrew from the competition prior to traveling to Port Moresby for its matches.

Results list Nauti FC's goal tally first.

Competition	Round	Club	Score
2008–09 OFC Champions League	Qualification	(Cook Islands) Tupapa Maraerenga	Withdrew
2008–09 OFC Champions League	Qualification	(Papua New Guinea) Hekari United	Withdrew

== Honours ==
=== League ===
- Tuvalu A-Division
  - Winners (17): 2000, 2005, 2007, 2008, 2009, 2010, 2011, 2012, 2013, 2014, 2015, 2016, 2019, 2020, 2022, 2023, 2026

=== Cup ===
- Independence Cup
  - Winners (7): 1988, 1990, 1999, 2003, 2008, 2009, 2017
  - Runners-up (5): 1998, 2004, 2007, 2012, 2013
- NBT Cup
  - Winners (4): 2009, 2010, 2016, 2020
- Tuvalu Games
  - Runners-up (3): 2010, 2013, 2017
- Christmas Cup
  - Winners (3): 2018, 2020, 2021
  - Runners-up (1): 2011

== See also ==
- Nauti Women
