= Nui F.C. =

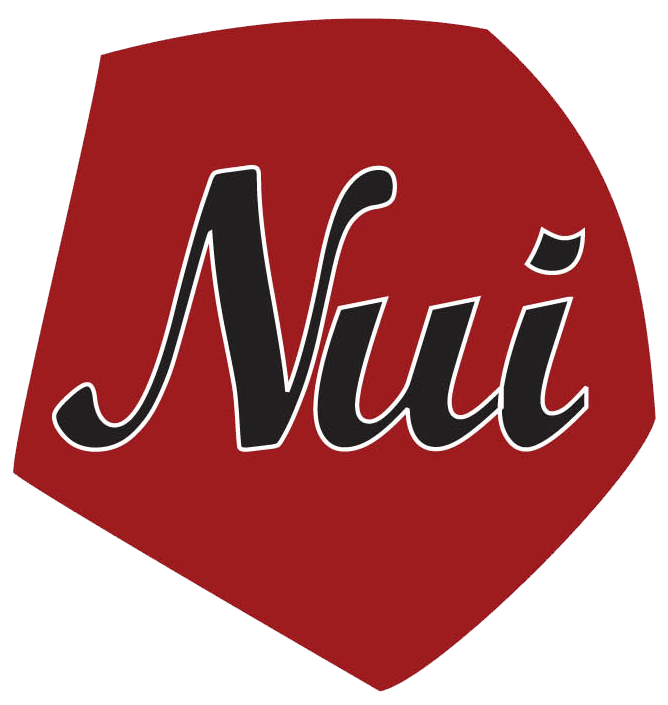
- Full name: Nui Football Club.
- Founded: 1980; 45 years ago
- Ground: Tuvalu Sports Ground, Funafuti, Tuvalu
- Capacity: 1,500
- Coach: Kimaele Luatamaki
- League: Tuvalu A-Division
- 2023: 3rd
Home colours	Away colours

Nui FC or Vaoloa is a Tuvaluan football club from Nui that plays in the Tuvalu A-Division. It was formed in 1980.

The team's home ground is the Tuvalu Sports Ground, the only football field in Tuvalu. Nui plays on an amateur level, as do all the teams in Tuvalu. Nui has not won a major Tuvalu competition, although they were the runner-up in the NBT Cup in 2010.

== Current squad ==
As of 5 July 2012.

Note: Flags indicate national team as defined under FIFA eligibility rules; some limited exceptions apply. Players may hold more than one non-FIFA nationality.

No.	Pos.	Nation	Player
1	GK	TUV	Ian Anderson
2	DF	TUV	Letaulau Pakai
3	DF	TUV	Maliomea Ulika
4	DF	TUV	Takapili Keleti
5	DF	TUV	Kaimata Sikope
6	MF	TUV	Maani Petaia
7	MF	TUV	Petueli Benehuro
8	MF	TUV	Ipitoa Sipole
9	FW	TUV	Pasiale Luatamaki

No.	Pos.	Nation	Player
10	FW	TUV	Lopati Okelani
11	FW	TUV	Liupo Sipa
12	FW	TUV	Ben Petaia
—	DF	TUV	Lemi Apepi
—	MF	TUV	Joe Teleilei
—	MF	TUV	Tulaga Ioteba
—	FW	TUV	Lekai Tulimanu
—		TUV	Tealava Maliomea
—		TUV	Iakoba Isaia

== Honours ==
=== Cup ===
- NBT Cup
  - Runners-up (1): 2010
- Independence Cup for Outer Islands Teams
  - Runners-up (1): 2008
