= F.C. Manu Laeva =

FC Manu Laeva
- Full name: Football Club Manu Laeva
- Founded: 1980; 46 years ago
- Ground: Tuvalu Sports Ground, Funafuti, Tuvalu
- Capacity: 1,500
- Chairman: Nukualofa Teake
- Coach: Pasene Malaki
- League: Tuvalu A-Division
- 2023: 5th
Home colours

FC Manu Laeva is a Tuvaluan football club from Nukulaelae that currently plays in the Tuvalu A-Division.

The team's home ground is the Tuvalu Sports Ground, the only football field in Tuvalu. Manu Laeva plays on an amateur level, as do all the teams in Tuvalu. They also have a reserve squad and a women's team.

== History ==
Manu Laeva was formed in 1980. The first name was Tavakisa for A team and the B Team Called Young Kisa. In 1998 Tavakisa and Young kisa were renamed Manu Laeva A and Manu Laeva B. In 1998 and 2001, they won their first prizes. Manu Laeva won 6–0 against FC Nanumaga in 1998 Tuvalu KnockOut Cup; and they won the Knock-Out Cup again in 2001. Of all teams they won the Tuvalu Games the most. They won it in 2008, 2009, and 2011, 2014 & 2017. Manu Laeva won the Independence Cup (held to recognise the independence of Tuvalu) in 2011, 2016 & 2018.

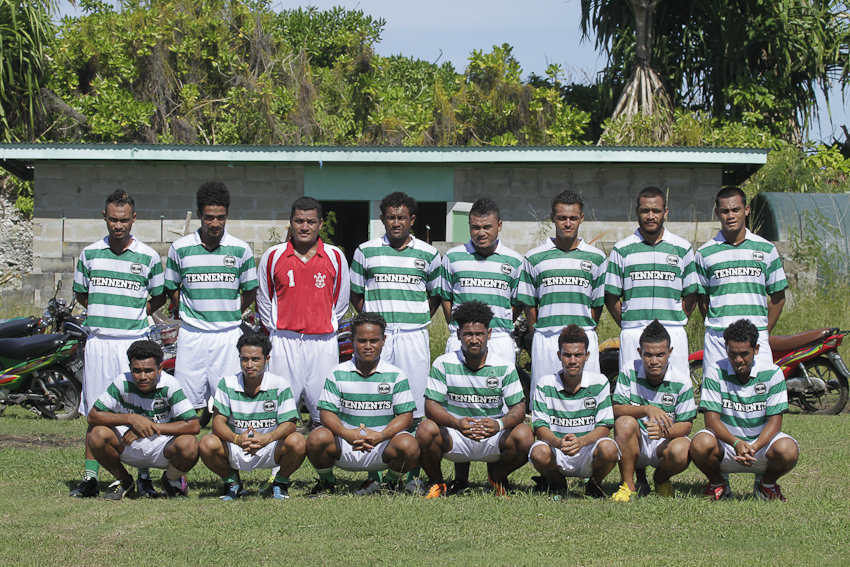
Manu Laeva A

== Current squad ==
As of 5 July 2017.

Note: Flags indicate national team as defined under FIFA eligibility rules; some limited exceptions apply. Players may hold more than one non-FIFA nationality.

No.	Pos.	Nation	Player
—	GK	TUV	Pitoi Fiavaai
—	GK	TUV	Semi Tafia
—	DF	TUV	Jelly Selau
—	DF	TUV	Joshua Tepaolo
—	DF	TUV	Kilo Lusama
—	DF	TUV	Peleuila Mauali
—	DF	TUV	Tausau Lopati
—	DF	TUV	Okilani Tinilau
—	DF	TUV	Tukai Vaega
—	DF	TUV	Alamoana Tofuola
—	MF	TUV	Akelei Lima'alofa

No.	Pos.	Nation	Player
—	MF	TUV	Tataa Luke
—	MF	TUV	Talofou Iosefa
—	MF	TUV	Mauga Siliva
—	MF	TUV	Folomanu Kulene
—	MF	TUV	Foliaki Tofuola
—	MF	TUV	Kiala Molu
—	MF	TUV	Epati Laipe
—	FW	TUV	Suega Tonise
—	FW	TUV	Moeava Mausalii
—	FW	TUV	Sio Silitone

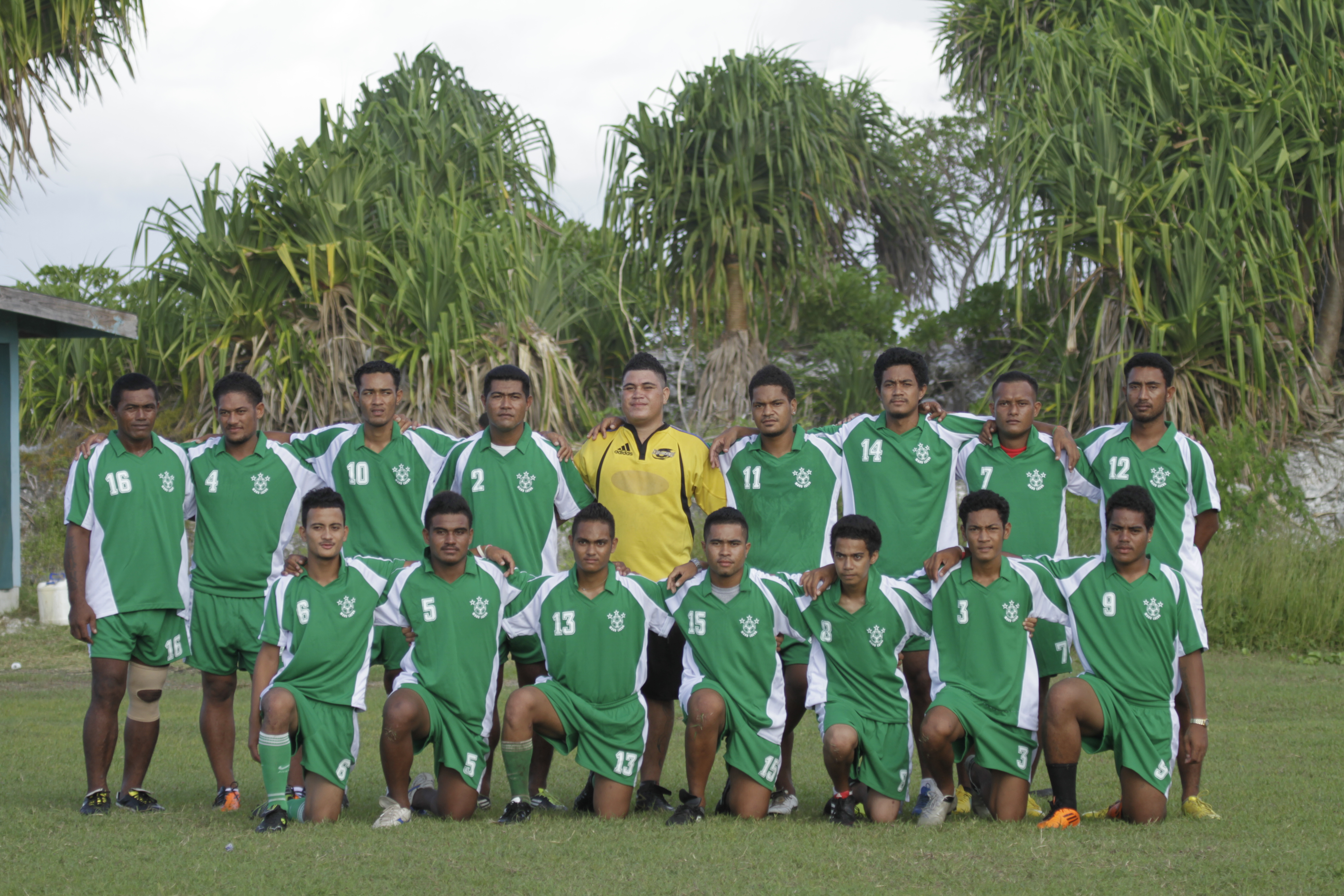
Manu Laeva B

=== Manu Laeva B ===
Note: Flags indicate national team as defined under FIFA eligibility rules; some limited exceptions apply. Players may hold more than one non-FIFA nationality.

No.	Pos.	Nation	Player
1	GK	TUV	Leiatu Vuli
2	DF	TUV	Metia Lotoala
3	DF	TUV	John Tapuaiga
4	DF	TUV	Tukai Vaela
5	DF	TUV	Isamaeli Niu
6	MF	TUV	Ameti Seneta
7	MF	TUV	Olaga Seneta
8	FW	TUV	Malofou Suamalie

No.	Pos.	Nation	Player
9	MF	TUV	Tafusi Tempesi
10	FW	TUV	Tito Tinilau
11	FW	TUV	Vagalia Hosea
12	FW	TUV	Nuku'alofa Teake
13	FW	TUV	Peati Mailagi
14	FW	TUV	Fakailoga Pule
15	MF	TUV	Koliano Kausea

== Managers ==
- (Tuvalu) Foai Paeniu (1988)
- (Tuvalu) Ioane Peleti (1998)
- (Tuvalu) Fiafiaga Lusama (????–2012)
- (Tuvalu) Rebery Pasene (2012)
- (Tuvalu) Pasene Malaki (2012–)

=== Staff ===
Position	Name
President	(Tuvalu) Nukualofa Teake
Vice President	(Tuvalu) Lusilupe Galu
Secretary	(Tuvalu) Okilani Tinilau
Treasurer	(Tuvalu) Tokasi Okilani
Committee Members	(Tuvalu) Leopold Paeniu and (Tuvalu) Tukai Vaega

== Honours ==
=== Cup ===
- Tuvalu Knockout Cup
  - Winners (2): 1998, 2001
- Independence Cup for Outer Islands Teams
  - Winners (2): 2009, 2023
- Independence Cup
  - Winners (3): 2011, 2016 & 2018
  - Runners-up (4):1988, 1990, 2003, 2006, 2015
- Tuvalu Games
  - Winners (4): 2008, 2009, 2011, 2014, 2017
- Christmas Cup
  - Winners (4): 2012, 2013, 2015, 2017

== See also ==
- Manu Laeva Women
