= Tuvalu Islands Football Association =

National Football Association

OFC
- Short name: TIFA
- Founded: 1979
- FIFA affiliation: N/A
- OFC affiliation: 2019 (associate member)
- President: Soseala Tinilau
- Website: https://teamtuvalu.tv/football

The Tuvalu Islands Football Association (TIFA) is the governing body of football in Tuvalu. The association is responsible for the Tuvalu national football team and the Tuvalu national futsal team. Tuvalu is not a full member and is not affiliated with FIFA. It does not compete in FIFA World Cup Qualifiers because of its non-affiliation.

Football in Tuvalu is played at club and national team level. The association is a member of the Oceania Football Confederation (OFC) but not affiliated to FIFA. The association has been wanting to be a member of FIFA since 1987. However the lack of football facilities in Tuvalu is a major obstacle for membership of FIFA. Tuvalu does not have a stadium, or training grounds or hotels for visiting teams and supporters.

== FIFA and Oceania Football Confederation (OFC) ==
History was made in 2007 when Tuvalu became the first non FIFA member to participate in an official World Cup qualifying match. The situation arose when the regional governing body used the 2007 South Pacific Games, as the first stage of the qualification tournament for the 2010 FIFA World Cup and qualification tournament for the 2008 OFC Nations Cup. Tuvalu performed with great credit, earning a remarkable 1–1 draw with Tahiti in which Viliamu Sekifu became as the first World cup scorer for his country. The other three fixtures in the tournament ended in defeat and Tuvalu failed to progress from their five team group.

Tuvalu has been wanting to be a member of FIFA since 1987. Paulson Panapa was president of the association, from 2001 to 2005. He was also chairman of the association from 2010 to 2014. Under his leadership, the association was actively trying to gain membership of FIFA. In September 2008, Tuvaluan Prime Minister Apisai Ielemia and the President of the association, Tapugao Falefou, visited the headquarters of FIFA in Zurich, hoping to gain full membership in the organisation. The Dutch Support Tuvalu Foundation is working with the TIFA to advance Tuvalu's FIFA application and with the development of football in Tuvalu. The Tuvalu team and the activities of the Dutch Support Tuvalu Foundation are the focus of Mission Tuvalu (Missie Tuvalu) (2013), a feature documentary directed by Jeroen van den Kroonenberg on Tuvalu's journey to becoming a FIFA member.

In June 2016, Soseala Tinilau was appointed as the President of the association. He has previous played football with Manu Laeva Football Club. As the president of TIFA, Soseala Tinilau was involved in negotiating development programmes and technical assistance from the Oceania Football Confederation (OFC) the governing body for football in Oceania under FIFA, such as grants of equipment and funds for capacity building activities and national team development.

In 2019, OFC restarted Tuvalu's Associate Membership, which will allow Tuvalu to take part in OFC tournaments. The restart of Tuvalu's associate membership of OFC, also means TIFA can access OFC's development programmes and will receive technical assistance and funding to develop football in Tuvalu, which includes airfares to attend OFC events.

== History ==
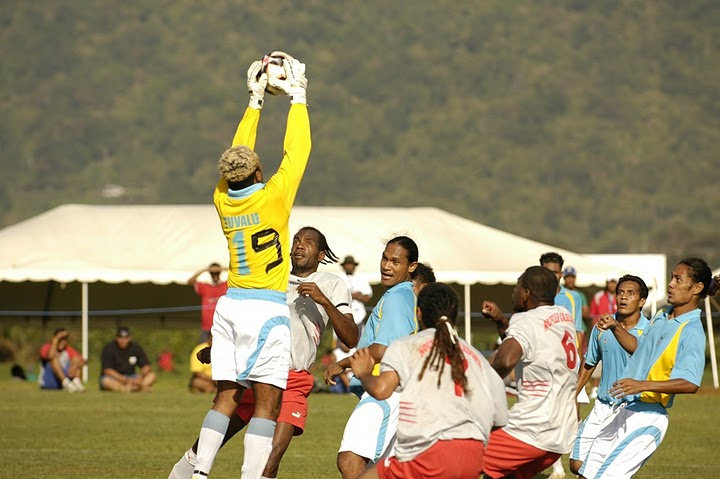
Jay Timo in the game against New Caledonia (2007)

On 28 August 1979, the Tuvalu national football team, captained by Karl Tili, played the first official soccer game against Tahiti in the Pacific Games at Suva, Fiji. Tuvalu loses 18–0. Later in the tournament on 31 August Tuvalu wins for the first time against Tonga with the final score of 5–3.

On 1 May 2003, Tuvalu played a friendly game against Fiji with a 9–0 loss.

Tuvalu also participated in four games at the 2003 South Pacific Games again held in Fiji, with Tim Jerks as the coach. After defeating Kiribati 3–2 in their opening game, Tuvalu again played Fiji, in this game Fiji won 4–0. In the game against Vanuatu, Tuvalu was defeated 1–0. In the final game of the tournament against Solomon Islands, Tuvalu was defeated 4–0. Tuvalu finished fourth out of five in Pool A.

Tuvalu became an associate member association of the Oceania Football Confederation (OFC) on 15 November 2006. Tuvalu participated in the 2007 Pacific Games held in Samoa, with Toakai Puapua as the coach, and Petio Semaia as the captain. Tuvalu is the first country, that as a non-FIFA-member, has taken part in an official FIFA World Cup-qualification tournament. The situation arose when the regional governing body used the 2007 South Pacific Games, as the first stage of the qualification tournament for the 2010 FIFA World Cup and qualification tournament for the 2008 OFC Nations Cup. In the competition Fiji defeated Tuvalu 16–0. However Tuvalu fought hard against New Caledonia (who were joint leaders of the competition) and only lost 1–0. Tuvalu then drew 1–1 with Tahiti, with a late equaliser from Viliamu Sekifu. However the Cook Islands defeated Tuvalu 4–1.

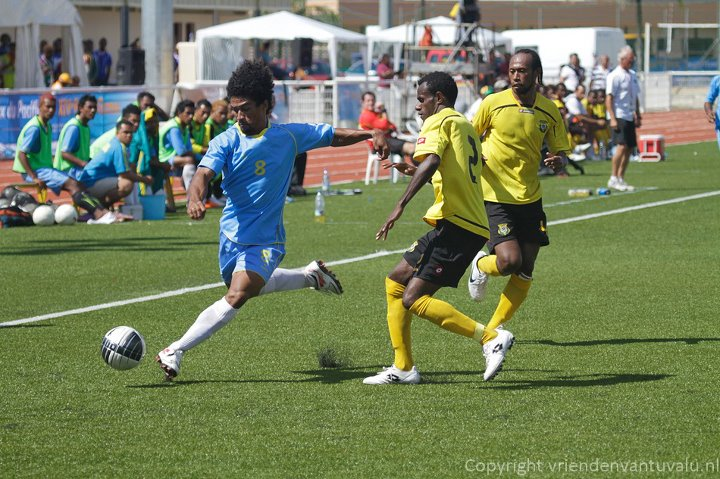
Okilani Tinilau in action against Vanuatu (2011)

In recent years the association have received support from the Netherlands.

In 2011 the association signed Dutch coach Foppe de Haan as the coach on a part-time and volunteer basis.

De Haan previously coached SC Heerenveen, Ajax Cape Town and the Dutch national U-21 team. In the friendly match in the lead-up to the 2011 Pacific Games, with Tuvalu captained by Mau Peninsula, De Haan started his tenure with a 3–0 victory over Samoa, the second largest victory of Tuvalu. Alopua Petoa scored all three goals.

De Haan's second match in charge saw a record 4–0 victory recorded over American Samoa in the first match of their 2011 Pacific Games campaign, with a hat-trick from 19-year-old Alopua Petoa. The third match was not as successful, with the side going down 5–1 to Vanuatu. After losing 8–0 to New Caledonia, and 6–1 to Solomon Islands, the Tuvaluan team drew the game with Guam 1–1. The Tuvaluan team finished in fourth place in Group A (equal with Guam), with a record number of goals. This is the best performance by Tuvalu in an international tournament.

Logo of Dutch Support Tuvalu Foundation

De Haan left his post after the tournament to rejoin Heerenveen's youth programme.

On 1 May 2012 Stevan de Geijter was appointed as the head of Youth Development. Former NAC Breda and De Graafschap coach Leen Looijen was the Tuvaluan team's mentor during their three-month training tour of the Netherlands in 2013, with the tour organised by the Dutch Support Tuvalu Foundation.

From 2014 to 2016, Toakai Puapua was the president of the association. He was succeeded by Soseala Tinilau in June 2016.

== Competitions ==
- A-Division (national league)
- B-Division (second national league)
- Independence Cup
- NBT Cup
- Christmas Cup
- Tuvalu Games
- A-Division (national women's league)
- Independence Cup
- NBT Cup
- Christmas Cup

== Player of the Year ==
In 2014 for the first time in history a Tuvaluan player of the year was chosen.

- 2014: Sepetaoi Willie

== See also ==
Men's

- Tuvalu national football team
- Tuvalu national futsal team
