= F.C. Nanumaga =

FC Nanumaga
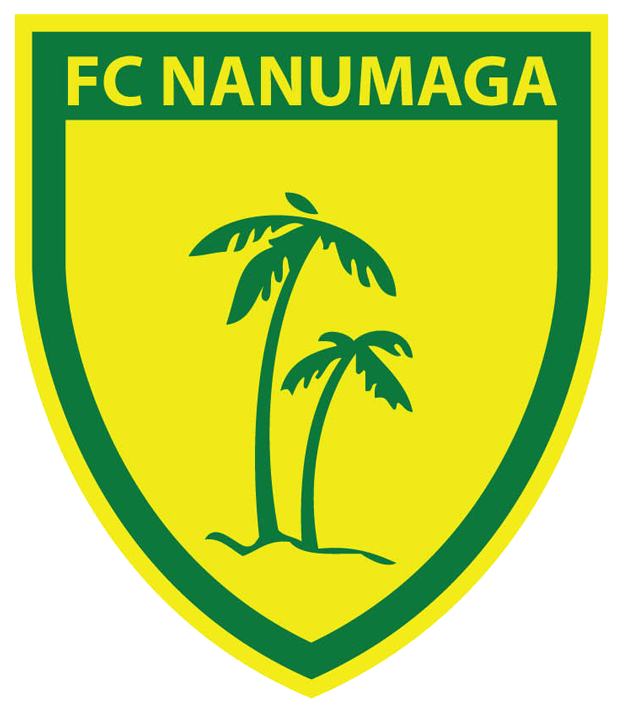
- Full name: Football Club Nanumaga
- Founded: 1980; 45 years ago
- Ground: Tuvalu Sports Ground, Funafuti, Tuvalu
- Capacity: 1,500
- Chairman: Teake Manatu
- Coach: Hamoa Holona
- League: Tuvalu A-Division
- 2014: 3rd
Home colours

FC Nanumaga or Ha'apai United is a Tuvalu football club from Nanumanga, playing in the Tuvalu A-Division.

The team's home ground is the Tuvalu Sports Ground, the only football field in Tuvalu. Nanumaga plays on an amateur level, as do all the teams in Tuvalu. They also have a reserve squad.

Nanumaga won its first major title in Tuvalu in 2023 by winning the Independence Cup (held to recognise the independence of Tuvalu), although they were the runner up in the Independence Cup in 2001 & 2002. In 2014, they were also the runner up in the Tuvalu Games competition, under their alternative name of Ha’apai United.

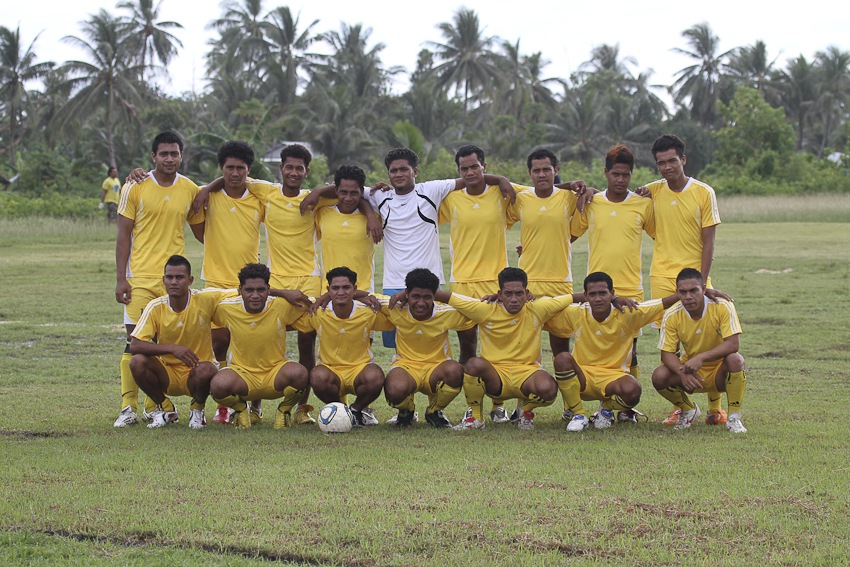
FC Nanumaga A 2012

== Current squad ==
As of 5 July 2012.

Note: Flags indicate national team as defined under FIFA eligibility rules; some limited exceptions apply. Players may hold more than one non-FIFA nationality.

No.	Pos.	Nation	Player
1	GK	(Tuvalu) TUV	Euta Kino
2	DF	(Tuvalu) TUV	Pakaia Paepae
3	DF	(Tuvalu) TUV	Vaiee Pelike
4	DF	(Tuvalu) TUV	Kapoa Kiula
5	DF	(Tuvalu) TUV	Tusia Pasama
7	MF	(Tuvalu) TUV	Vaiaho Napoe
8	MF	(Tuvalu) TUV	Fakaalo Paepae
9	FW	(Tuvalu) TUV	Sepuli Loaha
10	MF	(Tuvalu) TUV	Loua Petaia
11	MF	(Tuvalu) TUV	Amatusi Telogo
12	MF	(Tuvalu) TUV	George Laupane

No.	Pos.	Nation	Player
13	FW	(Tuvalu) TUV	Afelau Peletiso
14	MF	(Tuvalu) TUV	Ielemia Maheu
15	FW	(Tuvalu) TUV	Imo Fiamalua
16	FW	(Tuvalu) TUV	Mumuni Opeta
17	DF	(Tuvalu) TUV	Tenamasi Isopo
18	DF	(Tuvalu) TUV	Tuivaka Fiatala
19	MF	(Tuvalu) TUV	Alvin Tumua
—	DF	(Tuvalu) TUV	Mitilelei Fiamalua
—	MF	(Tuvalu) TUV	Nelesone Musika
—		(Tuvalu) TUV	Mati

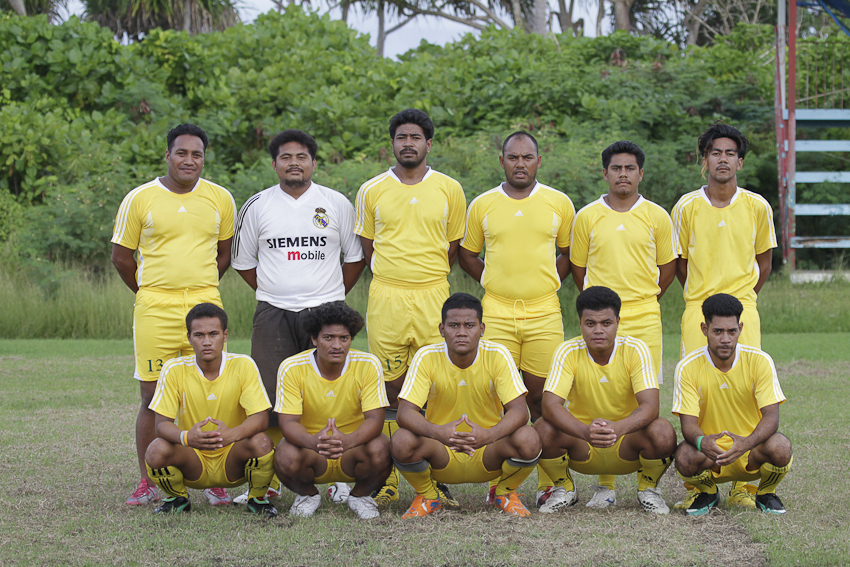
Ha'apai United B 2012

=== Ha'apai United B ===
Note: Flags indicate national team as defined under FIFA eligibility rules; some limited exceptions apply. Players may hold more than one non-FIFA nationality.

No.	Pos.	Nation	Player
—	GK	(Tuvalu) TUV	Polapola Keli
—	DF	(Tuvalu) TUV	Katoa Tetaa
—	DF	(Tuvalu) TUV	Puava Fiamalua
—	DF	(Tuvalu) TUV	Viiga Potoa
—	MF	(Tuvalu) TUV	Gagana Falaimo
—	MF	(Tuvalu) TUV	Falaimo Uina
—	MF	(Tuvalu) TUV	Sinoki Lalaia
—	MF	(Tuvalu) TUV	Sua Tepau
—	MF	(Tuvalu) TUV	Tafaoata Tuau
—	MF	(Tuvalu) TUV	Teinamasi Isopo

No.	Pos.	Nation	Player
—	MF	(Tuvalu) TUV	Toni Amosa
—	MF	(Tuvalu) TUV	Nofo Setima
—	FW	(Tuvalu) TUV	Samuelu Alefaio
—	FW	(Tuvalu) TUV	Aseta Petaia
—	FW	(Tuvalu) TUV	Kulesa Paepae
—	FW	(Tuvalu) TUV	Mahaga Teiaputi
—	FW	(Tuvalu) TUV	Nauoko Setefano
—	FW	(Tuvalu) TUV	Setima Piita
—	FW	(Tuvalu) TUV	Talitonu Malu

== Honours ==
=== Cup ===
- Tuvalu KnockOut Cup
  - Runners-up (1): 1998
- Independence Cup
  - Winners (1): 2023
  - Runners-up (2): 2001, 2002
- NBT Cup
  - Runners-up (2): 2008, 2016
- Tuvalu Games
  - Runners-up (1): 2014
