= Tamanuku =

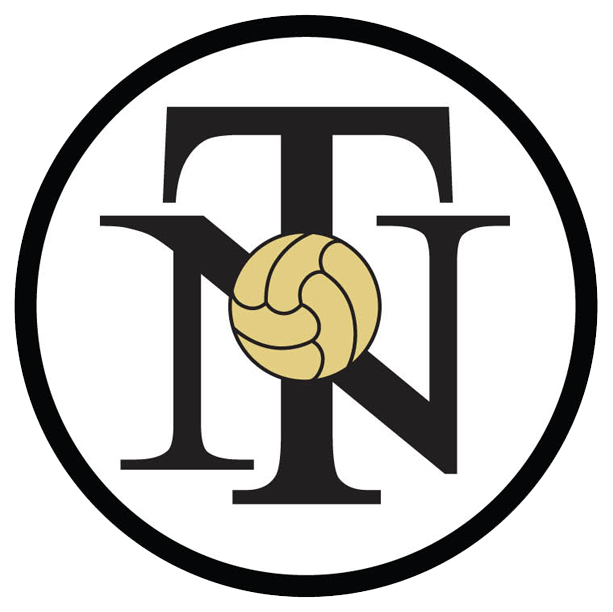
- Full name: Tamanuku
- Founded: 1980; 45 years ago
- Ground: Tuvalu Sports Ground, Funafuti, Tuvalu
- Capacity: 1,500
- Coach: Sofala Lafita
- League: Tuvalu A-Division
- 2014: 7th
Home colours

Tamanuku, formerly known as FC Teasi, is a Tuvaluan football club from Nukufetau that currently plays in the Tuvalu A-Division.

The team's home ground is the Tuvalu Sports Ground, the only stadium in Tuvalu. Tamanuku plays on an amateur level, as do all the teams in Tuvalu. They also have a reserve squad and a women's team.

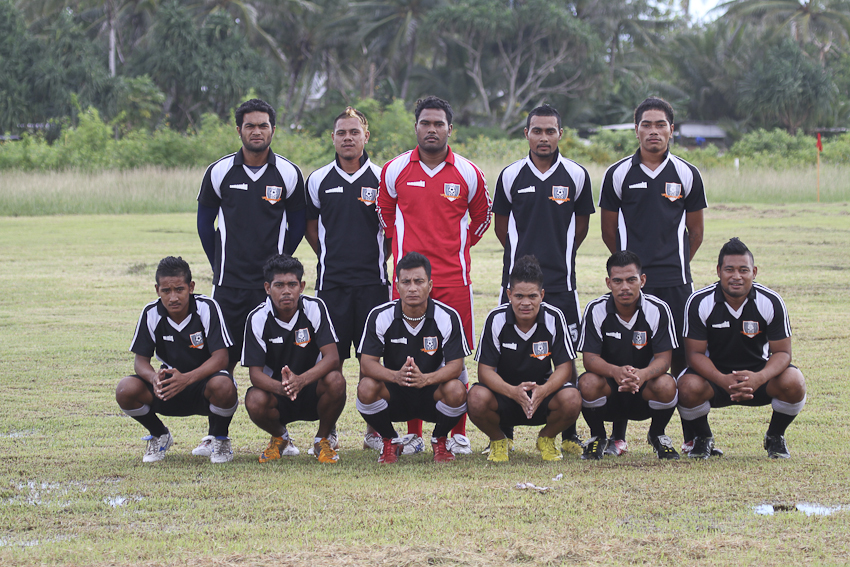
Tamanuku A

== History ==
Tamanuku was formed in 1980. The first name was FC Teasi. In 2015 Tamanuku won the Independence Cup (held to recognise the independence of Tuvalu), against Lakena United with a score of 1–0. They also won the NBT Cup in 2013, against Tofaga A with a score of 4-2.

== Current squad ==
As of 5 July 2012.

Note: Flags indicate national team as defined under FIFA eligibility rules; some limited exceptions apply. Players may hold more than one non-FIFA nationality.

No.	Pos.	Nation	Player
1	GK	(Tuvalu) TUV	Mika Katagali
2	DF	(Tuvalu) TUV	Antonio Tupe
3	DF	(Tuvalu) TUV	Mafoa Petaia
4	DF	(Tuvalu) TUV	Ilikia Lototele
5	DF	(Tuvalu) TUV	Ola Eliu
6	MF	(Tuvalu) TUV	Semaia Moeaga
7	MF	(Tuvalu) TUV	Felo Feoto
8	MF	(Tuvalu) TUV	Timali Katepu
9	FW	(Tuvalu) TUV	Aimasu Sio

No.	Pos.	Nation	Player
10	MF	(Tuvalu) TUV	Taufia Moulogo
11	FW	(Tuvalu) TUV	Fonotapu George
12	MF	(Tuvalu) TUV	Peniki Telogo
13	FW	(Tuvalu) TUV	Masolie Filioma
14	FW	(Tuvalu) TUV	Talavalu Lipua
15	DF	(Tuvalu) TUV	Tusitapu Maitoga
16	FW	(Tuvalu) TUV	Elia Tavita

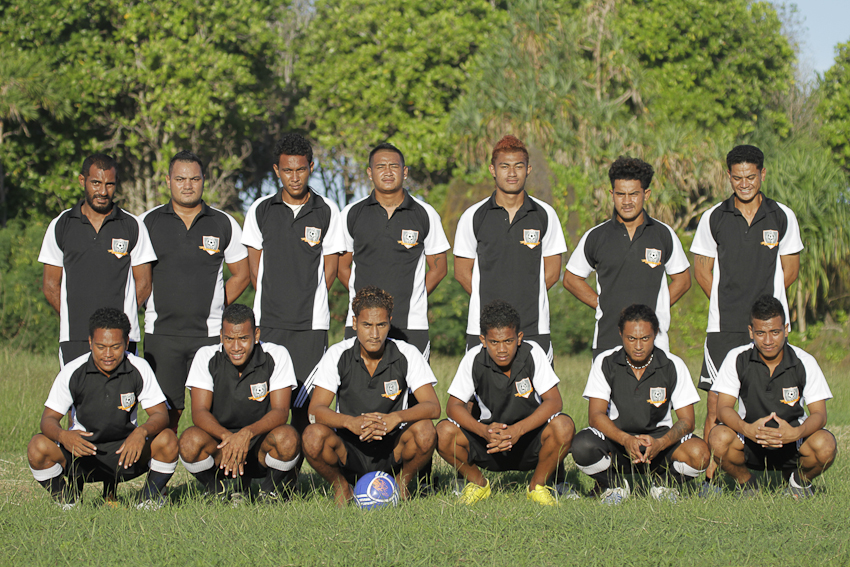
Tamanuku B

=== Tamanuku B ===
Note: Flags indicate national team as defined under FIFA eligibility rules; some limited exceptions apply. Players may hold more than one non-FIFA nationality.

No.	Pos.	Nation	Player
1	GK	(Tuvalu) TUV	Toluono Tusela
2	DF	(Tuvalu) TUV	Niuofo Fakaofo
3	DF	(Tuvalu) TUV	Epati Aisake
4	DF	(Tuvalu) TUV	Penivao Lonesi
5	DF	(Tuvalu) TUV	Ikapoti Kaisami
6	MF	(Tuvalu) TUV	Taliu Nukualofa
7	MF	(Tuvalu) TUV	Siliola Alatina
8	MF	(Tuvalu) TUV	Logologo Alimau
9	FW	(Tuvalu) TUV	Seluka Esau

No.	Pos.	Nation	Player
10	FW	(Tuvalu) TUV	Molesi Valoaga
11	FW	(Tuvalu) TUV	Amosa Moega
12	FW	(Tuvalu) TUV	Salamalaga Filioma
13	FW	(Tuvalu) TUV	Tefou Foufa
14	FW	(Tuvalu) TUV	Salamanu Tusitala
15	FW	(Tuvalu) TUV	Samuelu Eliakimo
16	?	(Tuvalu) TUV	Kulu Tavesia
17	MF	(Tuvalu) TUV	Salamalaga Filioma

== Honours ==
=== Cup ===
- Independence Cup
  - Winners (1): 2005
  - Runners-up (1): 2011
- NBT Cup
  - Winners (1): 2013
  - Runners-up (2): 2006, 2011
- Tuvalu Games
  - Runners-up (1):2012

== See also ==
- Tamanuku Women
