= F.C. Niutao =

FC Niutao
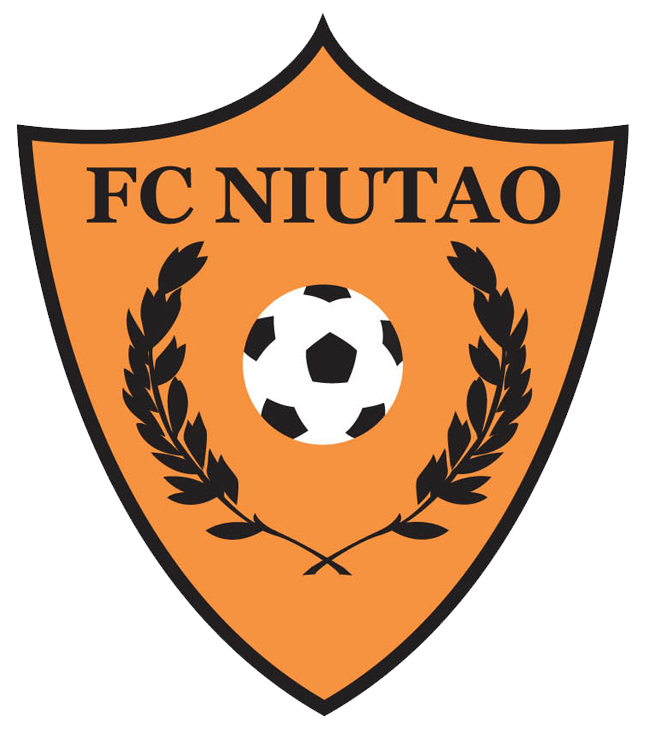
- Full name: Football Club Niutao
- Nickname(s): Niukita
- Founded: 1980; 45 years ago
- Ground: Tuvalu Sports Ground, Funafuti, Tuvalu
- Capacity: 1,500
- Chairman: Taufia Patolo
- Coach: Tiapolua Tautu
- League: Tuvalu A-Division
- 2021: 4th
Home colours

FC Niutao is a Tuvalu football club from Niutao, playing in the Tuvalu A-Division.

The team's home ground is the Tuvalu Sports Ground, the only football field in Tuvalu. Niutao plays on an amateur level, as do all the teams in Tuvalu. They also have a reserve squad.

== History ==
Niutao have won the first three years that the Tuvalu A-Division existed. In 2001, 2002 and in 2003. Nuitao were the runner up in the Independence Cup (held to recognise the independence of Tuvalu) in 1999 & 2000.

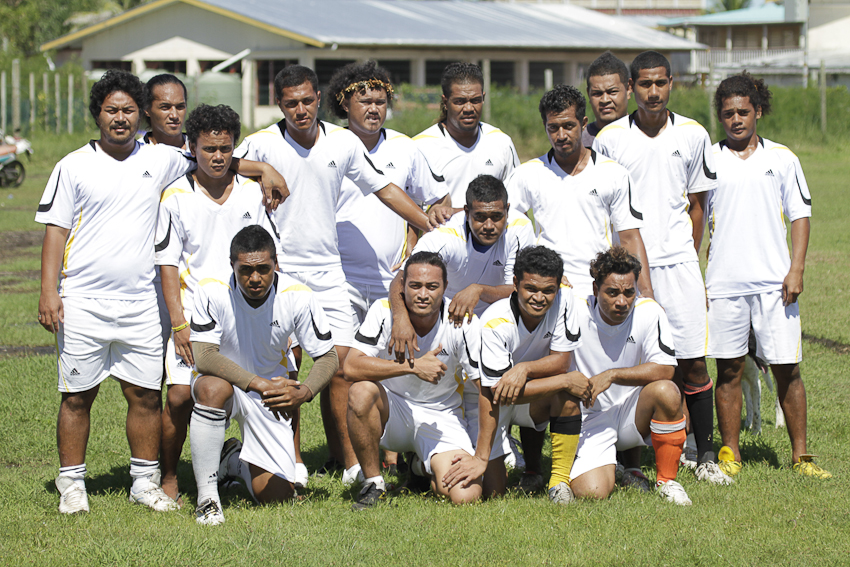
Niutao A

== Current squad ==
As of 5 July 2012.

Note: Flags indicate national team as defined under FIFA eligibility rules; some limited exceptions apply. Players may hold more than one non-FIFA nationality.

No.	Pos.	Nation	Player
1	GK	(Tuvalu) TUV	Samasoni Fapaologa
2	DF	(Tuvalu) TUV	Taukalo Lausaveve
5	DF	(Tuvalu) TUV	Sallu Tilaima
7	MF	(Tuvalu) TUV	Faesea Tuilevoni
8	MF	(Tuvalu) TUV	Mose Kapua
9	FW	(Tuvalu) TUV	Tui Faoga
10	MF	(Tuvalu) TUV	Matolu Togaivasa
15	MF	(Tuvalu) TUV	Limatusi Tulaga
16	FW	(Tuvalu) TUV	Ala Avia

No.	Pos.	Nation	Player
17	DF	(Tuvalu) TUV	Tofikai Eti
18	DF	(Tuvalu) TUV	Atina Itno
7r	MF	(Tuvalu) TUV	Fetelika Pusi
8r	MF	(Tuvalu) TUV	Suitai Mono
15r	MF	(Tuvalu) TUV	Nia Nakala
18r	DF	(Tuvalu) TUV	Lakalaka Lotolua
—	MF	(Tuvalu) TUV	Ioane Haumili
—	MF	(Tuvalu) TUV	Luka
—	FW	(Tuvalu) TUV	Roger Seu

=== Niutao B ===
As of 16 August 2012. Note: Flags indicate national team as defined under FIFA eligibility rules; some limited exceptions apply. Players may hold more than one non-FIFA nationality.

No.	Pos.	Nation	Player
1	GK	(Tuvalu) TUV	Teikauea Fakatoafe
—	DF	(Tuvalu) TUV	Teia Teikauea
—	DF	(Tuvalu) TUV	Nukai Vakalasi
—	DF	(Tuvalu) TUV	Letika Galulu
—	MF	(Tuvalu) TUV	Timote Niko
—	MF	(Tuvalu) TUV	Nalei Maluga
—	MF	(Tuvalu) TUV	Pule Telesia

No.	Pos.	Nation	Player
—	MF	(Tuvalu) TUV	Uale Kaipeti
—	MF	(Tuvalu) TUV	Penani Tapuli
—	FW	(Tuvalu) TUV	Iupeli Kamoni
—	FW	(Tuvalu) TUV	Aluna Penitala
—	FW	(Tuvalu) TUV	Tefili Pusi
—	FW	(Tuvalu) TUV	Soatagata Niuatea
—	FW	(Tuvalu) TUV	Faliki Niuatea

== Honours ==
=== League ===
- Tuvalu A-Division
  - Winners (3): 2001, 2002, 2003

=== Cup ===
- Independence Cup
  - Runners-up (2): 1999, 2000
