= Lakena United =

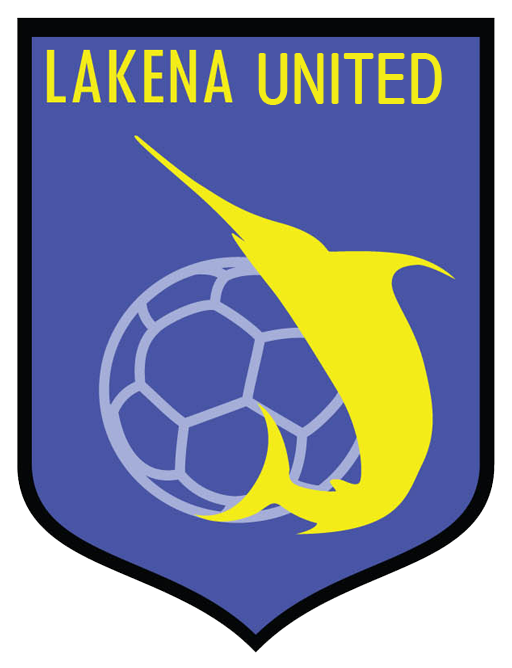
- Full name: Lakena United
- Founded: 1980; 45 years ago
- Ground: Tuvalu Sports Ground, Funafuti, Tuvalu
- Capacity: 1,500
- Coach: Tiota Semaia
- League: Tuvalu A-Division
- 2013: 5th
Home colours

Lakena United is a Tuvalu football club from Nanumea, playing in the Tuvalu A-Division.

The team's home ground is the Tuvalu Sports Ground, the only football field in Tuvalu. Lakena United plays on an amateur level, as do all the teams in Tuvalu. They also have a reserve squad and a women's team.

== History ==
Lakena United was formed in 1980.

Lakena United won in the Independence Cup six times in 2000, 2001, 2002, 2004, 2007 & 2019. And in 2004, and 2006, they won the Tuvalu A-Division. In 2011, they won the first time the Christmas Cup.

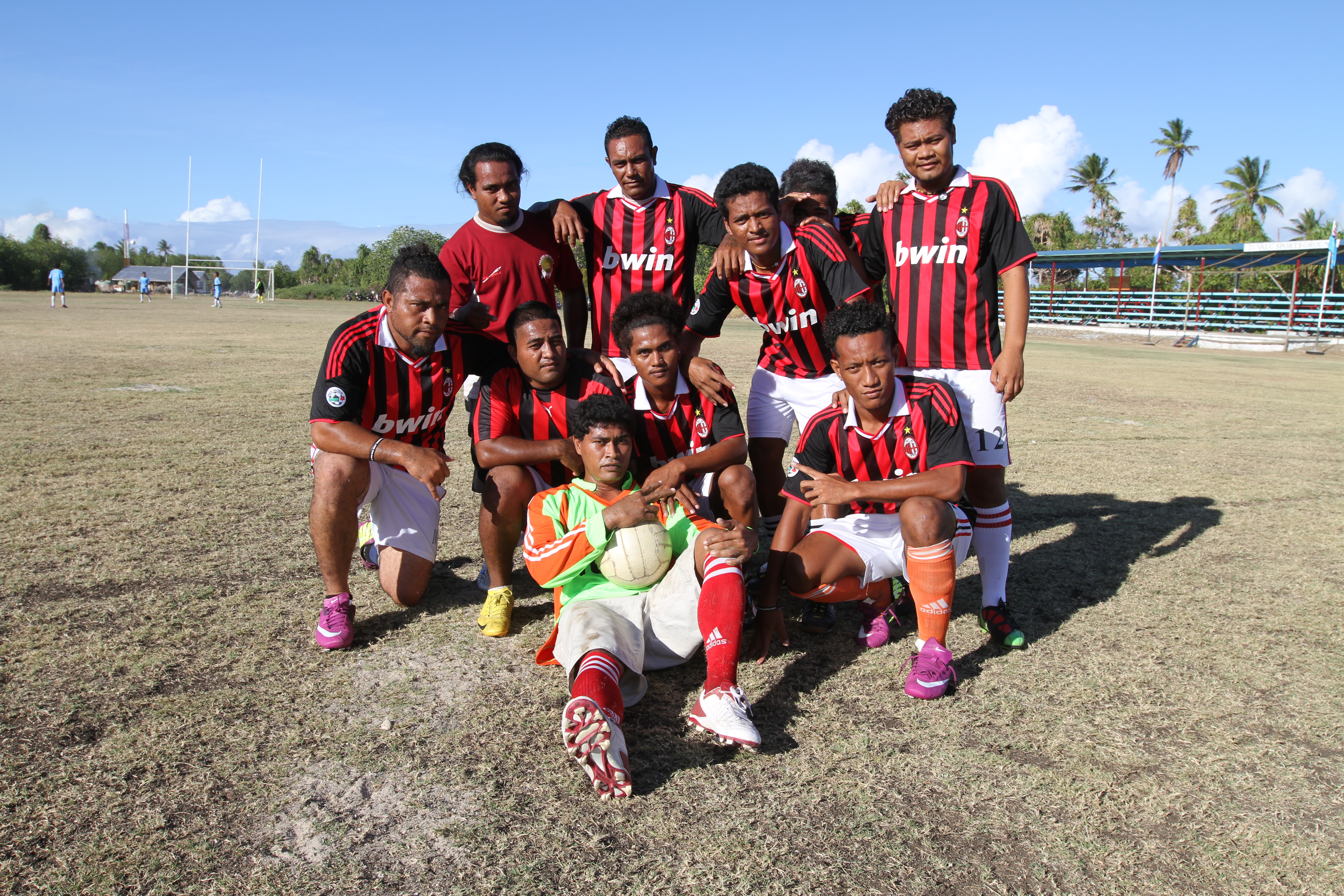
Lakena United A

== Current squad ==
As of 5 July 2012.

Note: Flags indicate national team as defined under FIFA eligibility rules; some limited exceptions apply. Players may hold more than one non-FIFA nationality.

| No. | Pos. | Nation | Player |
|---|---|---|---|
| 1 | GK | (Tuvalu) TUV | Donny Vaguna |
| 2 | DF | (Tuvalu) TUV | Malulu Tolauapi |
| 3 | DF | (Tuvalu) TUV | Iese Telina |
| 4 | DF | (Tuvalu) TUV | Ioane Haumili |
| 6 | MF | (Tuvalu) TUV | Tekita Nemia |
| 10 | MF | (Tuvalu) TUV | Falefati |
| 11 | MF | (Tuvalu) TUV | Mote Peti |
| 12 | MF | (Tuvalu) TUV | Laupula Huehe |
| 13 | FW | (Tuvalu) TUV | Samelu Toai |
| 14 | MF | (Tuvalu) TUV | Kaumaile David |
| 15 | FW | (Tuvalu) TUV | Tui Seu |

| No. | Pos. | Nation | Player |
|---|---|---|---|
| 16 | MF | (Tuvalu) TUV | Matagi Oki |
| 17 | DF | (Tuvalu) TUV | Malona Taukatea |
| 18 | DF | (Tuvalu) TUV | Vevea Toai |
| 19 | DF | (Tuvalu) TUV | Mauatu Teilauea |
| 20 | MF | (Tuvalu) TUV | Naaga Manase |
| 21 | MF | (Tuvalu) TUV | Petio Semaia |
| 22 | FW | (Tuvalu) TUV | Toma Fotu |
| 23 | FW | (Tuvalu) TUV | Samelu Toai |
| — | MF | (Tuvalu) TUV | Fakanaanga Manase |
| — | MF | (Tuvalu) TUV | Kanava Galuega |
| — | FW | (Tuvalu) TUV | Falegai Feagai |

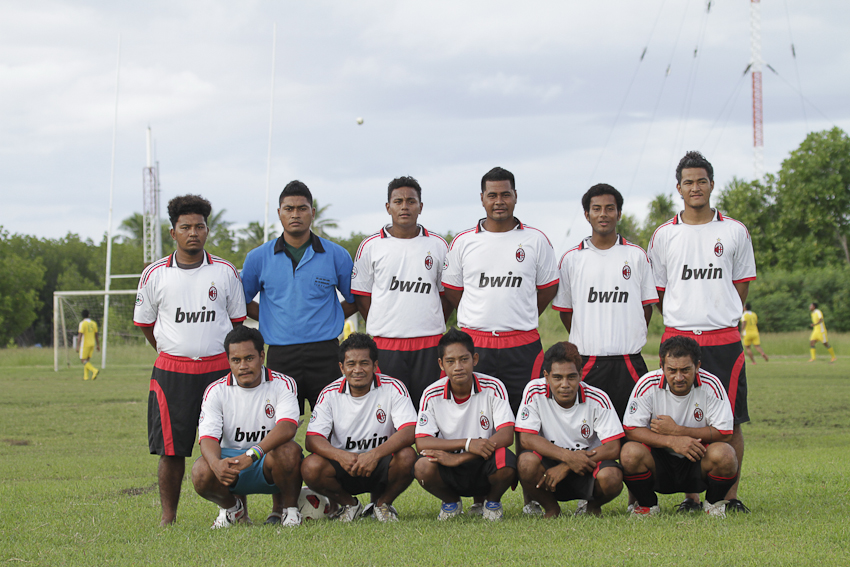
Lakena United B

=== Lakena United B ===
Note: Flags indicate national team as defined under FIFA eligibility rules; some limited exceptions apply. Players may hold more than one non-FIFA nationality.

| No. | Pos. | Nation | Player |
|---|---|---|---|
| — | GK | (Tuvalu) TUV | Siopepa Tailolo |
| — | DF | (Tuvalu) TUV | Teulie Teuhie |
| — | DF | (Tuvalu) TUV | Jack Konelio |
| — | DF | (Tuvalu) TUV | Rusia Teniki |
| — | DF | (Tuvalu) TUV | Nafatali Etini |
| — | MF | (Tuvalu) TUV | Lokea Misa |
| — | MF | (Tuvalu) TUV | Taukave Taukai |
| — | MF | (Tuvalu) TUV | Mola Fusia |
| — | MF | (Tuvalu) TUV | Hosea Solomona |

| No. | Pos. | Nation | Player |
|---|---|---|---|
| — | FW | (Tuvalu) TUV | Teumvona Tosina |
| — | FW | (Tuvalu) TUV | Ali Kahifa |
| — | FW | (Tuvalu) TUV | Manuela Lito |
| — | FW | (Tuvalu) TUV | Masiasi Titiamu |
| — | FW | (Tuvalu) TUV | Laupula Tekapu |
| — | FW | (Tuvalu) TUV | Lasalo Timgio |
| — | FW | (Tuvalu) TUV | Petelo Tuilava |
| — | FW | (Tuvalu) TUV | Likilua Uepa |
| — | FW | (Tuvalu) TUV | Tekaupa Amilale |

== Honours ==
=== League ===
- Tuvalu A-Division
  - Winners (2): 2004, 2006

=== Cup ===
- Independence Cup
  - Winners (6): 2000, 2001, 2002, 2004, 2007 & 2019
  - Runners-up (2): 2005, 2010
- Tuvalu Games
  - Runners-up (1): 2008
- Christmas Cup: (1)
  - Winners (1): 2011
  - Runners-up (1): 2010

== See also ==
- Lakena United Women
