= Tofaga FC =

Football club in Tuvalu

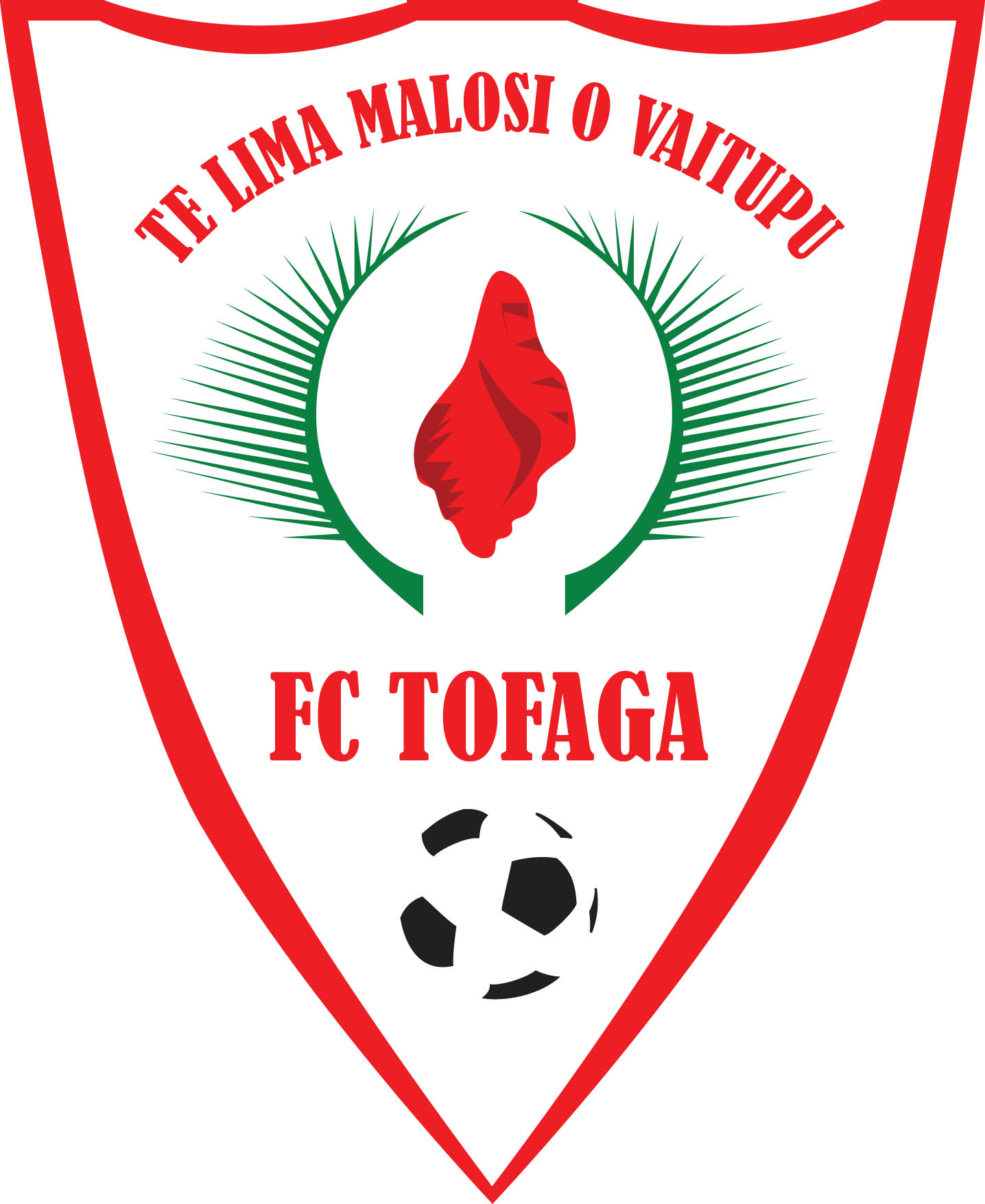
- Full name: Tofaga Football Club
- Founded: 1985
- Ground: Tuvalu Sports Ground, Funafuti, Tuvalu
- Capacity: 1,500
- League: Tuvalu A-Division
- 2021: 1st
Home colours

Tofaga FC is a Tuvalu football club from Vaitupu, playing in the Tuvalu A-Division.

The team's home ground is the Tuvalu Sports Ground, on Funafuti, which is the only football field in Tuvalu. Tofaga plays on an amateur level, as do all the teams in Tuvalu. They also have a reserve squad and a women's team.

== History ==
The team was originally name Vatokami and was founded in the 1970s. In the 1990s, Paulson Panapa and Tapugao Falefou were the team's well-known players. In 1997 the team won its first prize, the Benson and Hedges Cup. The team won the Independence Cup (held to recognise the independence of Tuvalu) in 1998.

In 2005, the team changed its name to Tofaga.

Toakai Puapua was coach from 2006 to 2008. He was also the football coach of Tuvalu during the 2007 South Pacific Games.

Tofaga won the NBT Cup and the Independence Cup in 2006. After that, the club regularly won cups; the NBT Cup in 2007, 2008 and 2011, and three prizes in 2010 (Tuvalu Games, Independence Cup and Christmas Cup). Tofaga won the Independence Cup 5 times, and the team has also won the NBT Cup 9 times, and was the runner-up 4 times.

Tofaga's only win of the Tuvalu A-Division competition was in 2021, although its players, including Alopua Petoa and James Lepaio, were topscorers in the Tuvalu A-Division competition, in 2011, 2012, 2019 & 2021, and Alopua Petoa is the topscorer with the Tuvalu national football team with 11 goals in his international career.

Tofaga was the runner-up in the 2023 Tuvalu A-Division competition. Tofaga won the NBT Cup in 2023, beating Vaoloa 2–1. The team included Etimoni Timuani (defender), James Lepaio (midfielder) and Alopua Petoa (striker).

== Honours ==
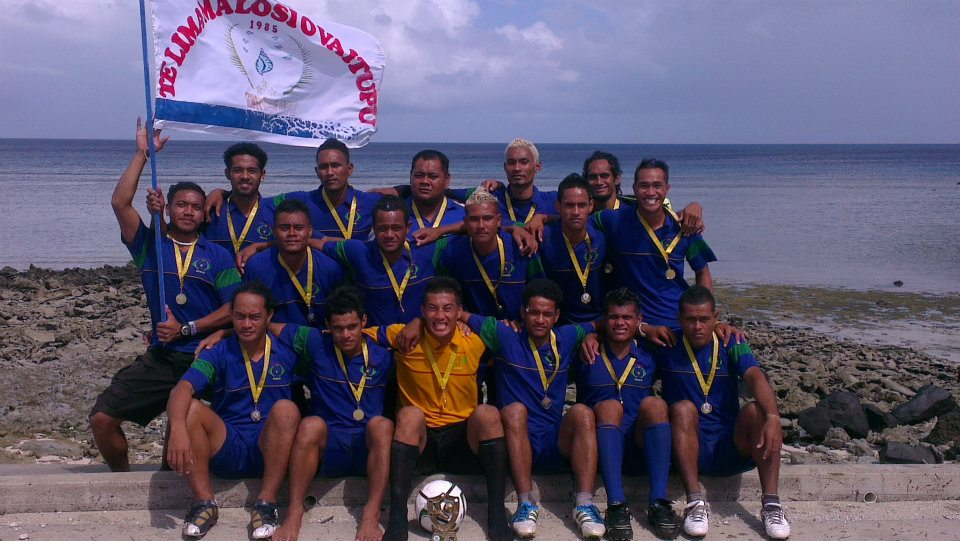
Tofaga A, winners of the Tuvalu Games competition 2012

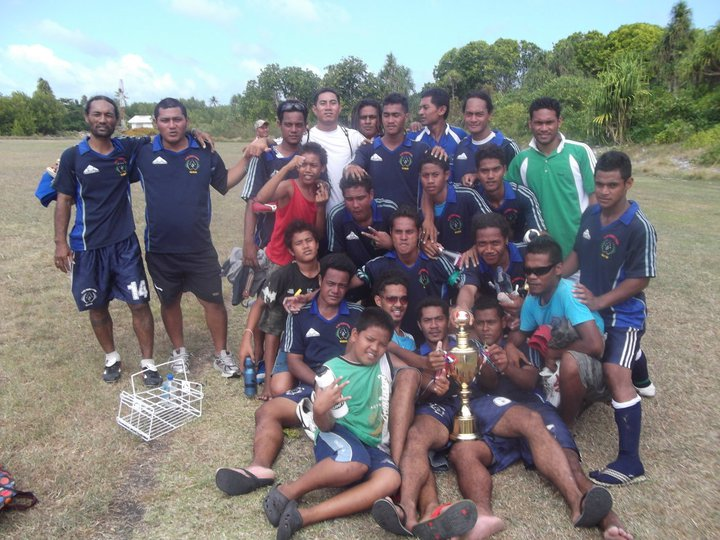
The players celebrating being champions of the 2010 Christmas Cup

=== League ===
- Tuvalu A-Division
  - Winners (1): 2021

The Tofaga reserve team has been the B-Team Champions 5 times: 2006, 2009, 2011, 2013 & 2021.

=== Cup ===
- Tuvalu Games
  - Winners (3): 2010, 2012, 2013
  - Runners-up (2): 2009, 2011
- Independence Cup
  - Winners (5): 1988, 2006, 2010, 2012, 2013
  - Runners-up (2): 2008, 2009
- NBT Cup
  - Winners (10): 2006, 2007, 2008, 2011, 2012, 2019, 2021, 2022, 2023, 2025
  - Runners-up (4): 2009, 2013, 2018, 2020
- Christmas Cup
  - Winners (2): 2010, 2019
  - Runners-up (2): 2012, 2013

== See also ==
- Tofaga Women
