= Tuvalu Sports Ground =

Stadium in Funafuti, Tuvalu

Coordinates: 8°31′26″S 179°11′55″E

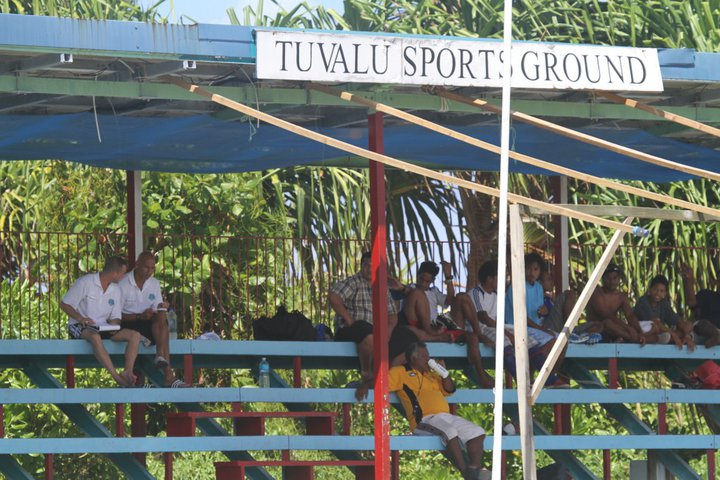
- Interactive map of Tuvalu Sports Ground
- Location: Funafuti, Tuvalu
- Capacity: 1,500
- Surface: Grass

Construction
- Opened: 2004

Tenants
- FC Manu Laeva; FC Nanumaga; FC Niutao; FC Tofaga; Lakena United; Nauti FC; Vaoloa; Tamanuku; Tuvalu national football team

Tuvalu Sports Ground is a multi-use stadium in Funafuti, Tuvalu. It is currently used mostly for football and rugby matches. The stadium holds 1,500 people. It is the only stadium in Tuvalu, and therefore all football tournaments are played at the stadium: A-Division; Independence Cup; NBT Cup; Tuvalu Games and also the Christmas Cup. The Tuvalu national football team draws from players in the Tuvalu A-Division, with the national team training at the Tuvalu Sports Ground. Some football games at the Tuvalu Sports Ground took place in front of at least 200 people.

The first large scale system for renewable energy in Tuvalu is a 40 kW solar panel installation on the roof of the Tuvalu Sports Ground stands. This grid-connected 40 kW solar system was established in 2008 by the E8 and Japan Government through Kansai Electric Company (Japan) and contributes 1% of electricity production on Funafuti. Future plans include expanding this plant to 60 kW.

== Stadium info ==
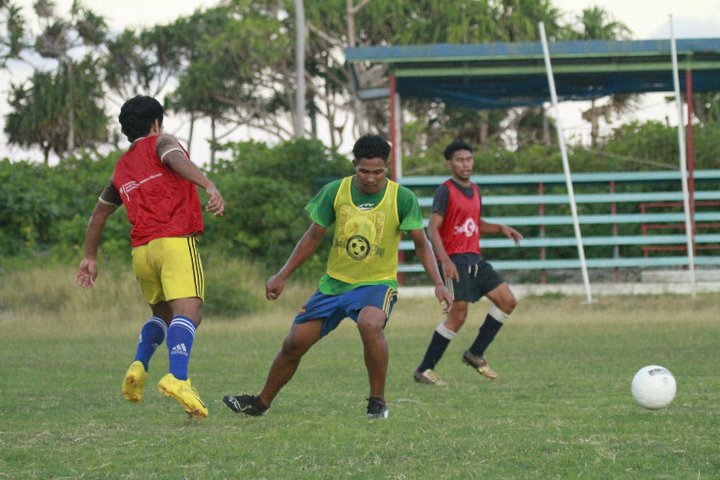
Players training in the Tuvalu Sports Ground

The islands of Tuvalu are narrow atolls composed of coral, so a football field could only be located at the broadest part of the main island of Funafuti.

The football field on Tuvalu is built on a coral base, with river clay shipped in from Fiji to create a surface on which grass has grown. This improved the football field's condition, although the surface remains hard and is not uniformly flat. Former association president Soseala Tinilau was hoping to install an artificial turf surface at the stadium in 2019. The artificial surface, it would hoped, would improve poor field condition caused by the local rugby matches.

The Tuvalu Islands Football Association has wanted since 1987 to be a member of FIFA. However, the lack of football and ancillary facilities in Tuvalu is a major obstacle for obtaining FIFA membership, because Tuvalu does not have any training grounds or hotels for visiting teams and supporters.
