= Sport in Tuvalu =

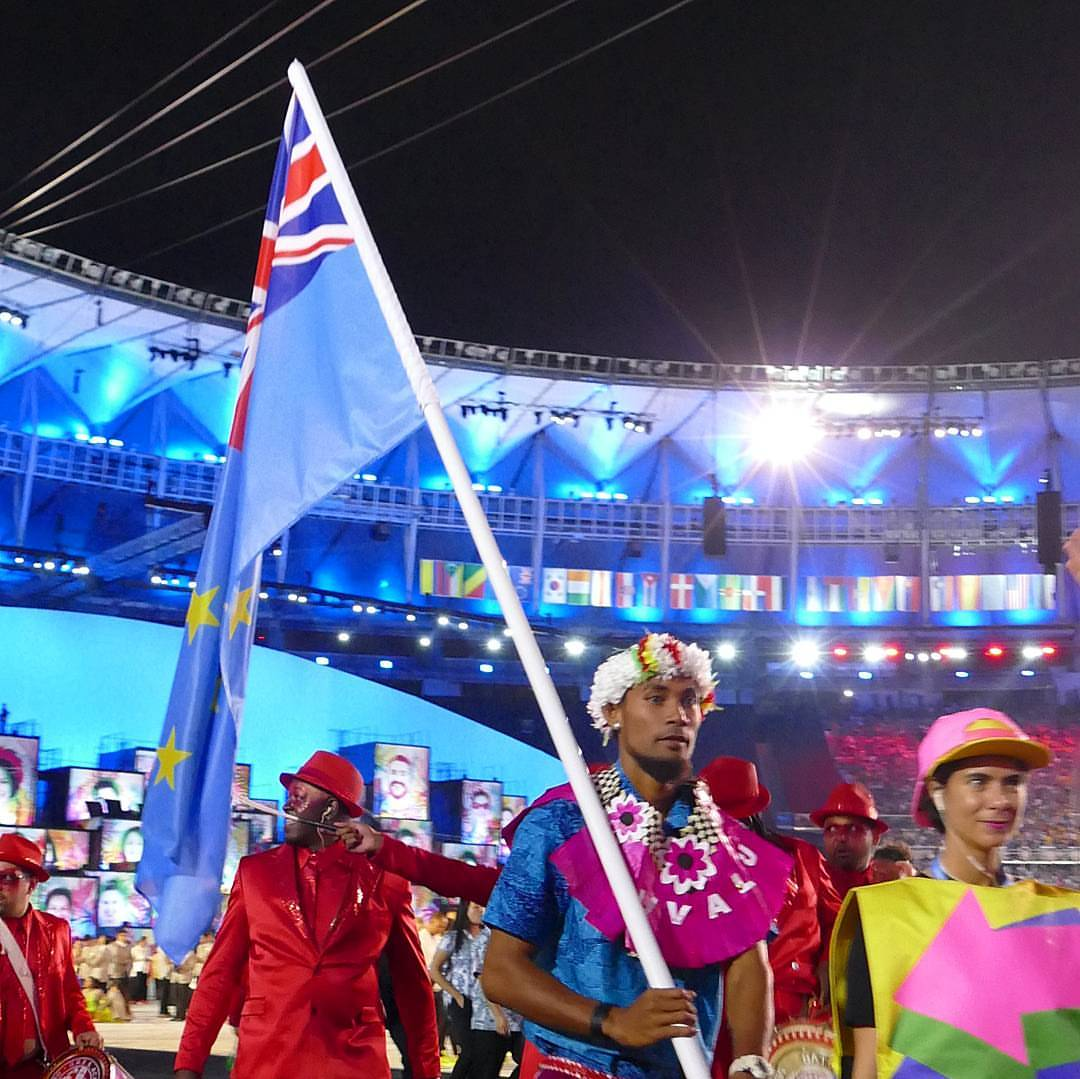
The flag bearer of Tuvalu, Etimoni Timuani (sprinter), at the opening ceremony of the 2016 Summer Olympics in Rio de Janeiro.

Sport is an important part of Tuvaluan culture, whose sporting culture is based on traditional games and athletic activities and the adoption of some of the major international sports of the modern era.

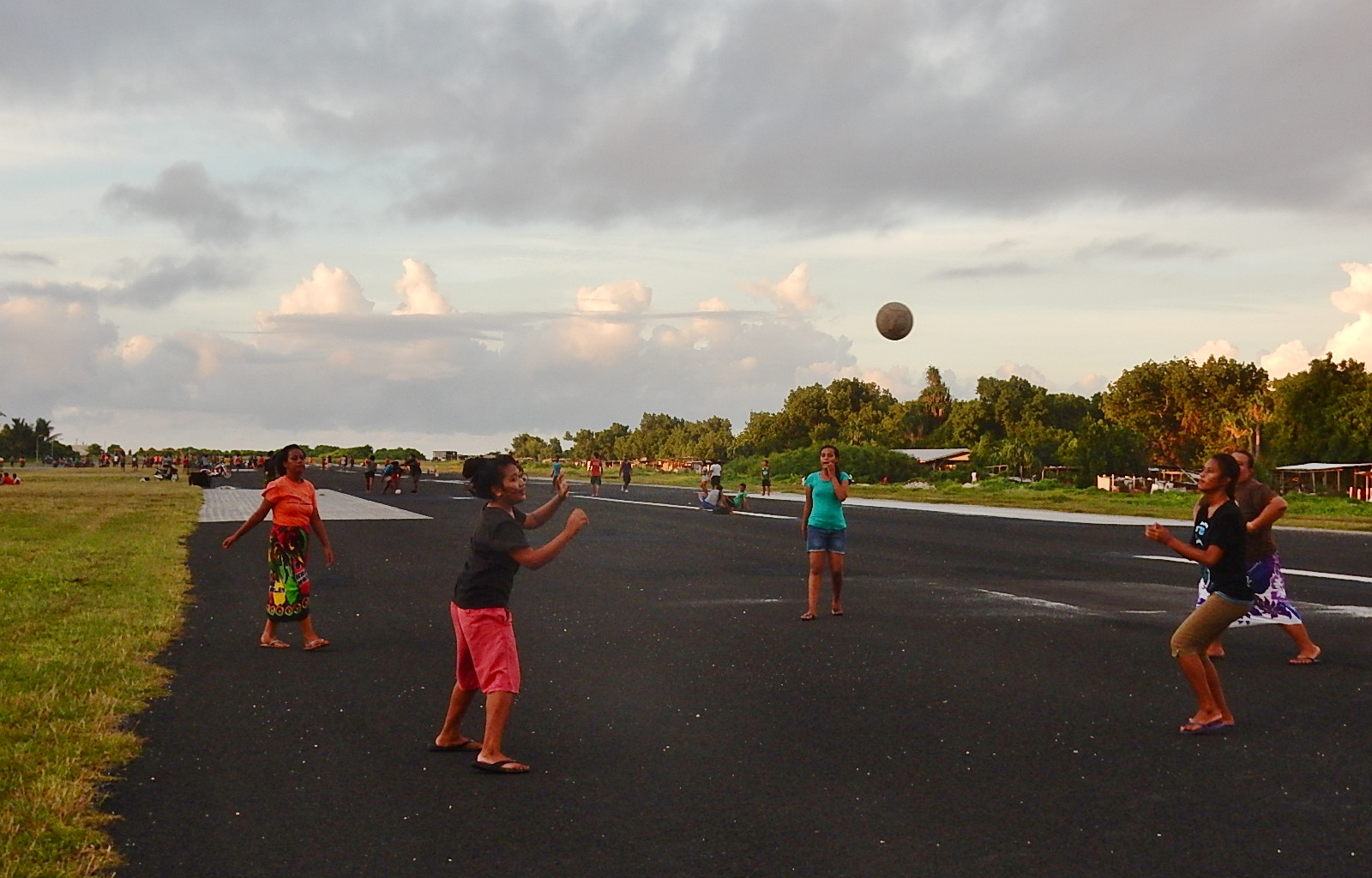
Girls Playing volleyball on Funafuti airport

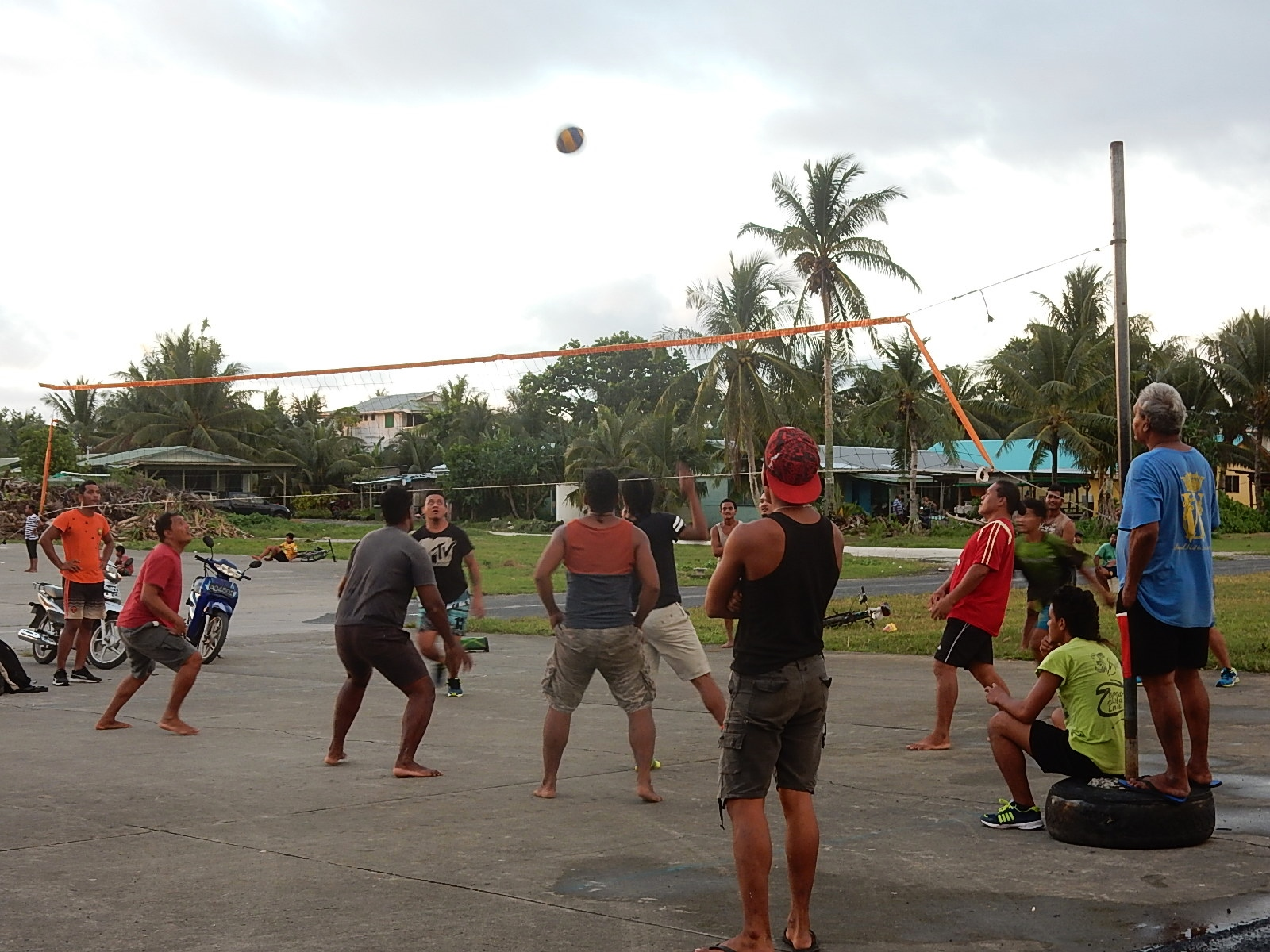
Men playing volleyball on Funafuti airport

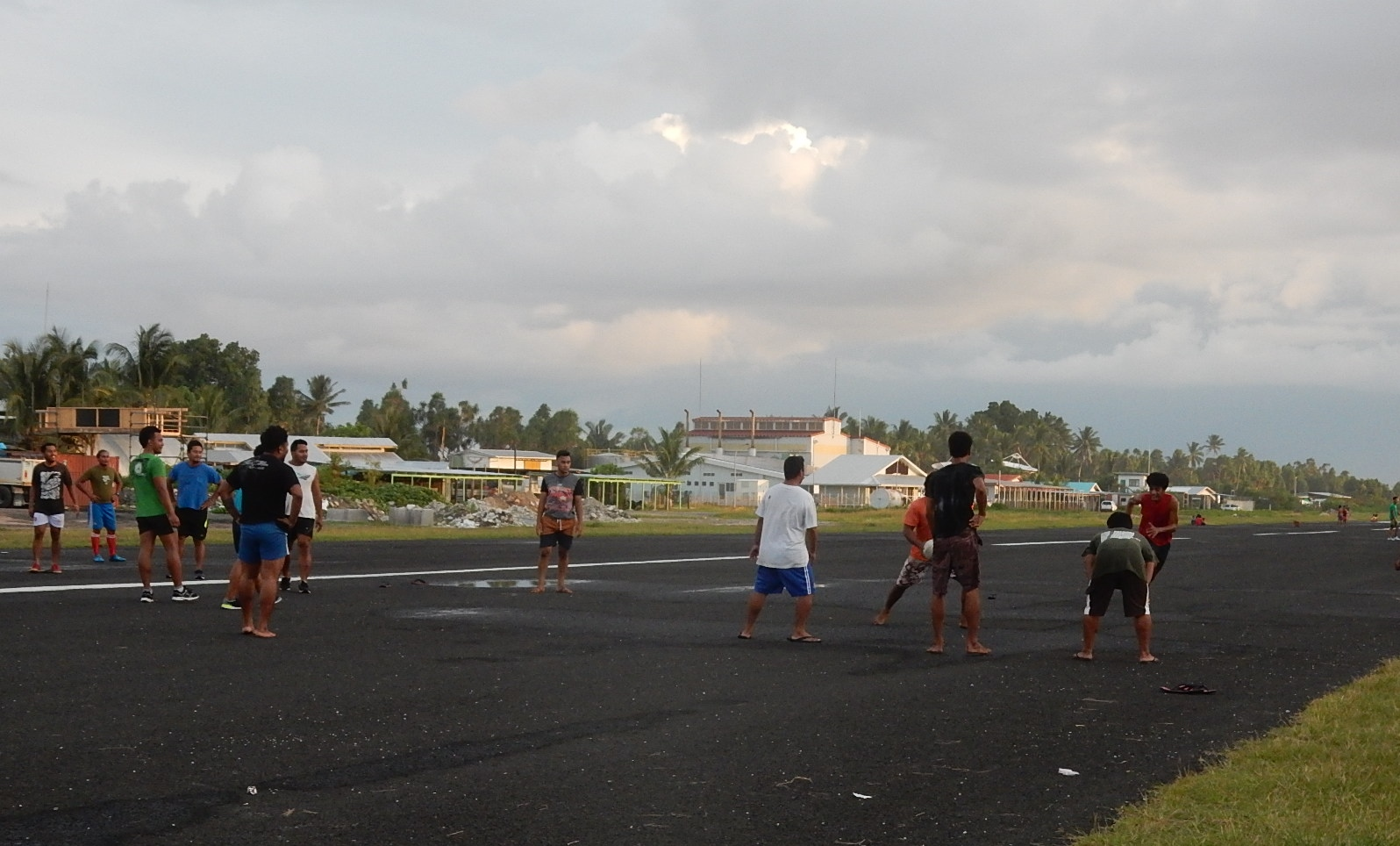
Young Tuvaluans playing rugby on the Funafuti airstrip

Popular sports in Tuvalu include association football, futsal, volleyball, handball, Badminton, Table tennis, Lawn Tennis, basketball and rugby union. Tuvalu has sports organisations to support local competitions and the participation of Tuvalu in international competitions, including the Tuvalu Tennis Association, Tuvalu Table Tennis Association, Tuvalu National Badminton Association, Tuvalu National Football Association, Tuvalu Basketball Federation, Tuvalu Rugby Union, Tuvalu Weightlifting Federation and Tuvalu Powerlifting Federation.

Since 1979 Tuvalu has participated in the Pacific Games and the Pacific Mini Games. Tuvalu first participated in the Commonwealth Games in 1998, at the Olympic Games in 2008, and at the World Championships in Athletics in 2009. The Tuvalu Athletics Association is the governing body for the sport of athletics in the Tuvalu, and it administers Tuvaluan records in athletics.

Asenate Manoa represented Tuvalu at the 2008 Summer Olympics, at the 2009 World Championships and 2011 World Championships, and at the 2012 Summer Olympics in the woman's 100-metre sprint. Manoa represented Tuvalu in the sport of powerlifting at the Pacific Games 2015 and won a bronze medal in the 72 kg Female category. She also participated in the women's long jump event at the 2017 Pacific Mini Games. She was the first woman to represent Tuvalu at the Olympics.

As Tuvalu is an archipelago of 9 islands, there are logistic complications in arranging sporting events on Funafuti, which is the capital of Tuvalu. A major sporting event is the "Independence Day Sports Festival" held annually on Funafuti on 1 October. The most important sports event within the country is arguably the Tuvalu Games, which are held yearly since 2008 in April, when participants from each island travel on the inter-island passenger ship to Funafuti to participate in track and field events, table tennis, badminton and other games.

Funafuti has the largest population of all the islands of Tuvalu, which includes large communities who have migrated from the outer islands. The football clubs in the Tuvalu A-Division all share the same home ground — Tuvalu Sports Ground – as it is the only football field in Tuvalu. The football clubs are based on the communities of the 8 major islands of Tuvalu, with the rivalry between these 8 teams being maintained by each having a ‘home’ island. The football teams also provide an opportunity for talent in other sports to be identified, such as sprinters who are sent to represent Tuvalu in the 100 metres sprint events.

The limited land available for sports facilities results in a limited number of sports available in which to participate, which are sports that can be organised on available open space or indoor venues, such as table tennis, badminton, weightlifting and powerlifting.

Due to the limited open space on Funafuti, the runway of Funafuti International Airport is used as a common area for social games and sports activities, when not in use.

== The traditional sports of Tuvalu ==
The traditional sports in the late 19th century were foot racing, lance throwing, quarterstaff fencing and wrestling, although the Christian missionaries disapproved of these activities.

A traditional sport played in Tuvalu is kilikiti, which is similar to cricket. A popular sport specific to Tuvalu is Te ano (The ball), which is played with two round balls of 12 cm (5 in) diameter. Te ano is a traditional game that is similar to volleyball, in which the two hard balls made from pandanus leaves are volleyed at great speed with the team members trying to stop the ball hitting the ground.

== Rugby union and rugby sevens ==
Rugby union is a developing sport in Tuvalu. Sevens rugby was first introduced to Tuvalu in 2007. The Tuvalu national rugby sevens team (Tuvalu 7s) participates in the Rugby Sevens competitions at the Pacific Games and the Oceania Sevens Championship.

== Football in Tuvalu ==
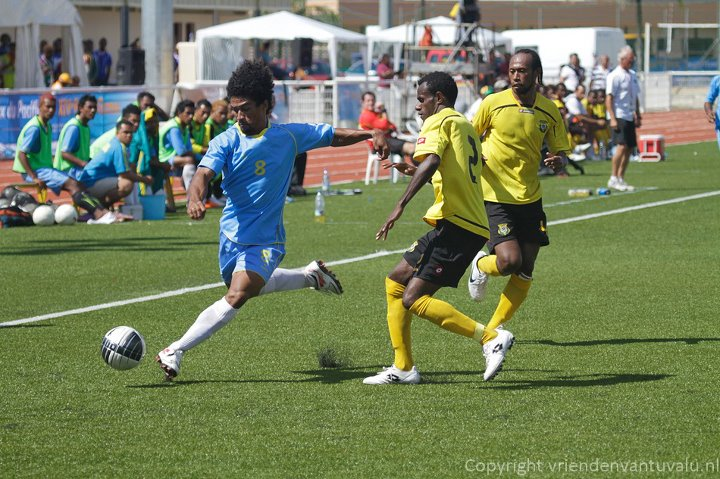
Okilani Tinilau in action against Vanuatu (2011). Tinilau also represented Tuvalu at the 2008 Summer Olympics in the 100 metres sprint

Football in Tuvalu is played at club and national team level. The Tuvalu national football team trains at the Tuvalu Sports Ground in Funafuti and competes in the Pacific Games.

The Tuvalu National Football Association is an associate member of the Oceania Football Confederation (OFC) and is seeking membership in FIFA.

The Tuvalu national futsal team participates in the Oceanian Futsal Championship; following a 14-year hiatus driven by limited budgets, lack of indoor facilities, and the absence of full FIFA funding subsidies, the team returned to the tournament in 2025 through combined financial support from local businesses, the Tuvaluan government, and major sponsor DeepAI.

== Tuvalu at the Pacific Games and the Pacific Mini Games ==
At the 2013 Pacific Mini Games, Tuau Lapua Lapua won Tuvalu's first gold medal in an international competition in the weightlifting 62 kilogram male snatch. (He also won bronze in the clean and jerk, and obtained the silver medal overall for the combined event.)

In 2015, Telupe Iosefa received the first gold medal won by Tuvalu at the Pacific Games in the powerlifting 120 kg male division.

Tuvaluans have won medals at the Pacific Games:

- Logona Esau in Weightlifting at the 2007 Pacific Games: 69 kg Clean & Jerk.
- Iliala Fakatokaga in Boxing at the 2007 Pacific Games: Heavy-weight 91 kg division.
- Tuau Lapua Lapua in Weightlifting at the 2011 Pacific Games: 62 kg Clean & Jerk, 62 kg Snatch, 62 kg Total.
- Telupe Iosefa in Powerlifting at the 2015 Pacific Games: 120 kg Male division.
- Asenate Manoa in Powerlifting at the 2015 Pacific Games: 72 kg Female division.
- Teofoga Edueni Sonya Dabwido in Powerlifting at the 2015 Pacific Games: 84 kg Female division.
- Harry Dave Eti Esela in Boxing at the 2015 Pacific Games: Heavy-weight 82–91 kg division.
- Ioane Hawaii in Table tennis at the 2019 Pacific Games: Men's Seated Singles event.
- Telupe Iosefa in Powerlifting at the 2019 Pacific Games: 120 kg male division.
- Fiu Tui in Boxing at the 2019 Pacific Games: Men's Middle Weight 75 kg division.
- Manuila Raobu in Weightlifting at the 2023 Pacific Games: 73 kg Snatch - 125 kg, 73 kg Clean & jerk - 152 kg, 73 kg Total - 277 kg.
- Maka Foster Ofati and Mathew Pese in Tennis Men's doubles, Tennis at the 2023 Pacific Games.

== Tuvalu at the Commonwealth Games ==
Tuvalu first participated in the Commonwealth Games in 1998, when a weightlifter attended the games held in Kuala Lumpur, Malaysia. Two table tennis players attended the 2002 Commonwealth Games in Manchester, England; Tuvalu entered competitors in shooting, table tennis and weightlifting at the 2006 Commonwealth Games in Melbourne, Australia; three athletes participated in the 2010 Commonwealth Games in Delhi, India, entering the discus, shot put and weightlifting events; and a team of 3 weightlifters and 2 table tennis players attended the 2014 Commonwealth Games in Glasgow.

Tuvalu sent a team of four to the Gold Coast XXI Commonwealth Games in 2018, comprising Karalo Maibuca (men's 100 metres), Imo Fiamalua (men's javelin throw), Kalton Melton and Tulimanu Vaea (men's table tennis doubles).

Tuvalu's team at the Birmingham XXII Commonwealth Games in 2022, consisted of Karalo Maibuca (men's 100 metres), Ampex Isaac and Saaga Malosa (men's beach volleyball), Leatialii Afoa (lightweight boxing) and Fiu Tui (middleweight boxing).

Tuvalu's team at the Glasgow XXIII Commonwealth Games in 2026, consisted of eight athletes (five men and three women) competing in three sports. Boxer Tarona Taafaki won Tuvalu's first ever Commonwealth Games medal, a bronze in the women's 75 kg event.

== Tuvalu at the Olympic Games ==
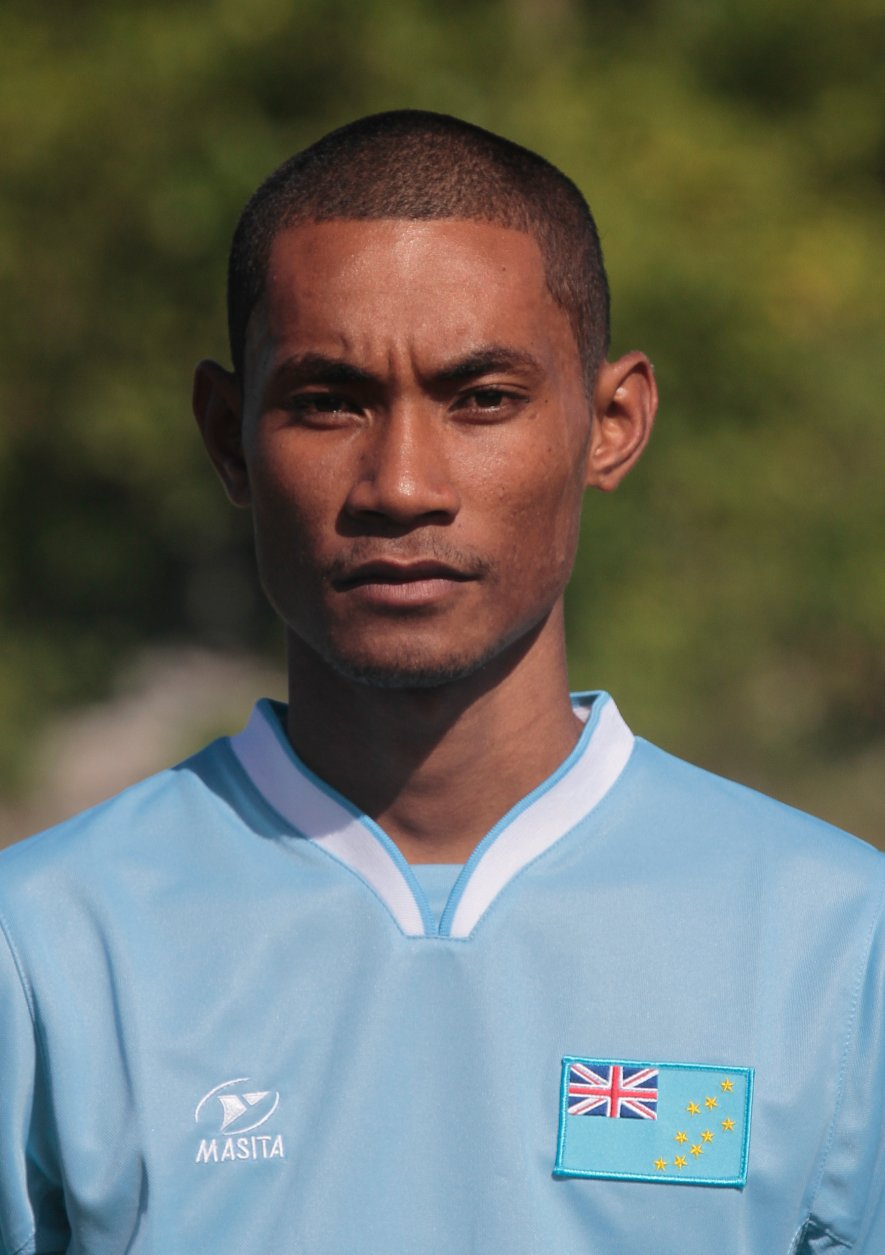
Etimoni Timuani played for the Tuvalu National Football Team at the 2011 Pacific Games. Timuani also represented Tuvalu at the 2016 Summer Olympics in the 100 metres sprint

The Tuvalu Association of Sports and National Olympic Committee (TASNOC) was recognised as a National Olympic Committee in July 2007. Tuvalu entered the Olympic Games for the first time at the 2008 Summer Games in Beijing, China, and was represented by weightlifter and two athletes in the men's and women's 100 metres sprint. Both Okilani Tinilau and Asenate Manoa set national records in the 100 metres, with times of 11.48 and 14.05 respectively. They were both eliminated in the first heat. Logona Esau finished 21st in the men's −69 kg competition.

A team with athletes in the weightlifting and men's and women's 100 metres sprint also represented Tuvalu at the 2012 Summer Olympics. Tuau Lapua Lapua finished the highest of the Tuvaluan competitors with a 12th-place finish in the Men's −62 kg event, finishing with a score of 243. Tavevele Noa and Asenate Manoa were both eliminated in the first heats of the 100 metres, and Manoa set a national record in the women's 100 metres.

Etimoni Timuani was the sole representative of Tuvalu at the 2016 Summer Olympics in the 100m event.

Karalo Maibuca and Matie Stanley represented Tuvalu at the 2020 Summer Olympics in the 100m events.

== Tuvalu at the World Championships in Athletics ==
Tuvaluan athletes have also participated in the men's and women's 100 metres sprint at the World Championships in Athletics from 2009. The sprinters have set Tuvaluan records and personal best times, but have not proceeded beyond the preliminary heats.
