= Tuvalu at the Pacific Games =

Tuvalu at the 2015 Pacific Games
- IOC code: TUV
- Medals Ranked 22nd: Gold 2 Silver 8 Bronze 6 Total 16

Pacific Games appearances (overview)
- 1979; 1983–1995; 1999; 2003; 2007; 2011; 2015; 2019; 2023

Tuvalu participates in the Pacific Games which is a multi-sport event with participation exclusively from countries in Oceania. Known as the South Pacific Games prior to 2009, the games are currently held every four years.

Tuvalu made its first appearance at the 1979 South Pacific Games held in Suva, Fiji. Telupe Iosefa received the first ever gold medal won by Tuvalu at the 2015 Pacific Games in the powerlifting 120 kg male division.

Tuvalu also participates in the Pacific Mini Games, which is a scaled-down version of the main games that enable smaller nations to host events and compete against each other and which is similarly rotated on a four-year basis in the intervening years between the main games.

== History of participation by Tuvaluan athletes ==
A combined Gilbert and Ellice Islands team participated at the 1963, 1966, and 1971 South Pacific Games. An athlete from Tuvalu (then Ellice Islands), namely Nelu Arenga, is at least documented for 1971.

Athletes from Tuvalu attended the 2003 South Pacific Games for the first time.

Logona Esau was the first athlete from Tuvalu to win a medal at an international competition, when he took bronze at the 2005 South Pacific Mini Games in Koror, Palau.

Tuvalu competed at the 2007 Pacific Games in Apia, Samoa. Tuvalu was ranked 18th equal at the Games, with 2 medals (0 gold - 1 silver - 1 bronze).

Tuvalu competed at the 2011 Pacific Games in Nouméa, New Caledonia. Tuvalu was ranked 17th at the Games, with 3 medals (0 gold - 2 silver - 1 bronze).

At the 2013 Pacific Mini Games in Mata-Utu, Wallis and Futuna, Tuau Lapua Lapua won Tuvalu's first ever gold medal in an international competition in the weightlifting 62 kilogram male snatch. (He also won bronze in the clean and jerk, and obtained the silver medal overall for the combined event.)

Tuvalu competed at the 2015 Pacific Games in Port Moresby, Papua New Guinea. Nakibae Kitisane was the Chef de Mission. Tuvalu was ranked 19th at the Games, with 4 medals (1 gold - 0 silver - 3 bronze). Telupe Iosefa received the first ever gold medal won by Tuvalu at the Pacific Games in the powerlifting 120 kg male division.

Tuvalu competed at the 2017 Pacific Mini Games held at Port Vila, Vanuatu, winning 2 medals (0 gold - 1 silver - 1 bronze). The team included Asenate Manoa (women’s long jump), Meauma Petaia (men’s long jump), Imo Fiamalua (men’s javelin throw), Vaiuli Nukualofa (men’s javelin throw), Tupou Koliano, Vaiuli Nukualofa, Meauma Petaia and Karalo Maibuca (men’s 100 metres & 4 x 100 metres relay), Ioane Hawaii (men's table tennis) and Manuila Raobu (men's weightlifting).

- The Tuvaluan football team placed 4th in the men’s competition with 2 wins and 3 losses.
- Imo Fiamalua placed 8th in the men’s javelin throw event and set a Tuvaluan national record of 53.62 metres.
- Tupou Koliano, Vaiuli Nukualofa, Meauma Petaia and Karalo Maibuca placed 6th in the 4 x 100 m relay and set a Tuvaluan national record of 46.07 seconds.

Tuvalu competed at the 2019 Pacific Games in Apia, Samoa. Tuvalu was ranked 20th at the Games, with 3 medals (1 gold - 1 silver - 1 bronze).

Tuvalu sent a team of athletes to the 2022 Pacific Mini Games and won 3 medals (2 gold - 1 bronze). The team included Maka Foster Ofati, Mathew Pese and Faolaina Tepa Haleti, who participated in men’s tennis. Manuila Raobu participated in Weightlifting at the 2022 Pacific Mini Games, which competition was also designated the 2022 Oceania Senior Weightlifting Championships. Ampex Isaac and Saaga Malosa represented Tuvalu in the Beach volleyball competition. For the first time, Maeli Ioane and Betty Resture represented Tuvalu in the Badminton competition.

Tuvalu competed at the 2023 Pacific Games in Honiara, Solomon Islands, from 19 November to 2 December 2023, with team members winning silver medals in weightlifting and the men's tennis doubles competition.

== Pacific Games medals ==
- Logona Esau in Weightlifting at the 2007 Pacific Games: 69 kg Clean & Jerk.
- Iliala Fakatokaga in Boxing at the 2007 Pacific Games: Heavy-weight 91 kg division.
- Tuau Lapua Lapua in Weightlifting at the 2011 Pacific Games: 62 kg Clean & Jerk, 62 kg Snatch, 62 kg Total.
- Telupe Iosefa in Powerlifting at the 2015 Pacific Games: 120 kg Male division.
- Asenate Manoa in Powerlifting at the 2015 Pacific Games: 72 kg Female division.
- Teofoga Edueni Sonya Dabwido in Powerlifting at the 2015 Pacific Games: 84 kg Female division.
- Harry Dave Eti Esela in Boxing at the 2015 Pacific Games: Heavy-weight 82–91 kg division.
- Ioane Hawaii in Table tennis at the 2019 Pacific Games: Men's Seated Singles event.
- Telupe Iosefa in Powerlifting at the 2019 Pacific Games: 120 kg male division.
- Fiu Tui in Boxing at the 2019 Pacific Games: Men's Middle Weight 75 kg division.
- Manuila Raobu in Weightlifting at the 2023 Pacific Games: 73 kg Snatch - 125 kg, 73 kg Clean & jerk - 152 kg, 73 kg Total - 277 kg.
- Maka Foster Ofati and Faolina Tepa Haleti in Tennis Men’s doubles, Tennis at the 2023 Pacific Games.

== Pacific Mini Games medals ==
- Logona Esau: in the 62 kg combined weightlifting event at the 2005 South Pacific Mini Games.
- Tuau Lapua Lapua: 62 kg Weightlifting – Snatch, at the 2013 Pacific Mini Games; He also won 62 kg Weightlifting – Clean and jerk, and for the combined event.
- Ioane Hawaii: in the men’s seated singles table tennis event at the 2017 Pacific Mini Games.
- Manuila Raobu: 62 kg Weightlifting – Snatch at the 2017 Pacific Mini Games.
- Manuila Raobu in Weightlifting at the 2022 Pacific Mini Games: 73 kg Snatch, 73 kg Total. In the 2022 Oceania Championships, 73 kg division, Manuila Raobu was also a gold medalist:.
- Ampex Isaac and Saaga Malosa: in Beach volleyball at the 2022 Pacific Mini Games.

== Participation of the Tuvalu national football team ==
Tuvalu have appeared in the finals of the football competition at the Pacific Games on four occasions in 1979, 2003, 2007 and 2011. The football team did not participated in the 2015 Pacific Games.

=== Record ===
Year	Round	Position	GP	W	D*	L	GS	GA
1963 to 1975	Did not enter	-	-	-	-	-	-	-
(Fiji) 1979	Quarter-finals	8th	5	2	0	3	16	43
1983 to 1999	Did not enter	-	-	-	-	-	-	-
(Fiji) 2003	Round 1	8th	4	1	0	3	3	11
(Samoa) 2007	Round 1	9th	4	0	1	3	2	22
(France) 2011	Round 1	7th	5	1	1	3	7	20
2015	Did not enter	-	-	-	-	-	-	-
(Samoa) 2019	Round 1	-	5	0	1	4	2	42
Total	5/16		23	4	3	16	30	128

Pacific Games matches (By team)
Total : 4 Wins – 3 Ties – 16 Losses – 23 games played
Against	Wins	Draws	Losses	Total	Against	Wins	Draws	Losses	Total
Tahiti	0	1	2	3	Vanuatu	0	0	2	2
Tonga	1	0	0	1	Solomon Islands	0	0	3	3
New Caledonia	0	0	4	4	Cook Islands	0	0	1	1
Kiribati	2	0	0	2	American Samoa	1	1	0	2
Fiji	0	0	3	3	Guam	0	1	1	2

== Tuvalu national football team at the 1979 South Pacific Games ==
=== Group 2 ===
Team	Pts	Pld	W	D	L	GF	GA	GD
Tahiti	4	2	2	0	0	26	0	+26
Tuvalu	2	2	1	0	1	5	21	-16
Tonga	0	2	0	0	2	3	13	-10

28 August 1979

Tahiti	18 - 0	Tuvalu

Fiji

31 August 1979

Tuvalu	5 - 3	Tonga

Fiji

=== Quarter finals ===
4 September 1979

New Caledonia	10 - 2	Tuvalu

Fiji

=== Consolation Tournament (5th-12th place) ===
5 September 1979

Tuvalu	3 - 3 (4–2 pens.)	Kiribati

Fiji

=== Semi finals ===
6 September 1979

Guam	7 - 2	Tuvalu

Fiji

== Tuvalu national football team at the 2003 South Pacific Games ==
=== Group A ===
Team	Pts	Pld	W	D	L	GF	GA	GD
Fiji	10	4	3	1	0	18	1	+17
Vanuatu	8	4	2	2	0	21	2	+19
Solomon Islands	7	4	2	1	1	14	4	+10
Tuvalu	3	4	1	0	3	3	11	-8
Kiribati	0	4	0	0	4	2	40	-38

June 30, 2003
13:00

Tuvalu	3 - 2	Kiribati
Kivoli Manoa 3'; Paenui Fagota 75'; Petio Semaia 81'		Lawrence Nemeia 26' 46'

National Stadium Suva, Fiji
Referee: Harry Attison (Vanuatu)

July 1, 2003
15:00

Fiji	4 - 0	Tuvalu
Esala Masi 1' 15'; Salesh Kumar 38' 41'

National Stadium Suva, Fiji
Attendance: 3,000
Referee: Jimmy Wright (New Caledonia)

July 3, 2003
19:00

Tuvalu	0 - 1	Vanuatu
		Manley Junior Tabe 86'

National Stadium Suva, Fiji
Attendance: 700
Referee: Gidas Bayung (Papua New Guinea)

July 5, 2003
13:00

Tuvalu	0 - 4	Solomon Islands
		Colman Maniadalo 16'; Commins Menapi 27' 87'; Batram Suri 80'

Ratu Cakobau Park, Nausori, Fiji
Attendance: 2,500
Referee: Gidas Bayung (Papua New Guinea)

== Tuvalu national football team at the 2007 Pacific Games ==
=== Group A ===
Team	Pld	W	D	L	GF	GA	GD	Pts
Fiji	4	3	1	0	25	1	+24	10
New Caledonia	4	3	1	0	6	1	+5	10
Tahiti	4	1	1	2	2	6	−4	4
Cook Islands	4	1	0	3	4	9	−5	3
Tuvalu	4	0	1	3	2	22	−20	1

25 August 2007
18:00 UTC-11

Fiji	16 – 0	Tuvalu
Krishna 6', 14', 22'; Rabo 11', 34', 45'; Baleitoga 17'; Tiwa 28', 30'; Vakatalesau 42', 46', 65', 73', 82', 89'; Finau 68' (pen.)	Report

Toleafoa J.S. Blatter Complex, Apia, Samoa
Attendance: 200
Referee: Fiti Aimaasu (Samoa)

27 August 2007
15:00 UTC-11

Tuvalu	0 – 1	New Caledonia
	Report	Kabeu 52'

Toleafoa J.S. Blatter Complex, Apia, Samoa
Attendance: 250
Referee: Nelson Sogo (Solomon Islands)

29 August 2007
15:00 UTC-11

Tuvalu	1 – 1	Tahiti
Sekifu 87'	Report	Willams 45+1'

Toleafoa J.S. Blatter Complex, Apia, Samoa
Attendance: 100
Referee: Chris Lengata (Solomon Islands)

1 September 2007
12:30 UTC-11

Cook Islands	4 – 1	Tuvalu
Mateariki 28', 69'; Le Mouton 88'; Tom 90+3'	Report	Willis 83' (o.g.)

Toleafoa J.S. Blatter Complex, Apia, Samoa
Attendance: 200
Referee: Michael Hester (New Zealand)

== Tuvalu national football team at the 2011 Pacific Games ==
=== Group A ===
Team	Pld	W	D	L	GF	GA	GD	Pts
New Caledonia	5	4	0	1	31	2	+29	12
Solomon Islands	5	4	0	1	19	3	+16	12
Vanuatu	5	4	0	1	18	7	+11	12
Tuvalu	5	1	1	3	7	20	−13	4
Guam	5	1	1	3	4	21	−17	4
American Samoa	5	0	0	5	0	26	−26	0

27 August 2011
09:00

Tuvalu	4 – 0	American Samoa
Petoa 15', 90', 90+2'; Tiute 30'	Report

Stade Rivière Salée, Nouméa
Referee: Averii Jacques (Tahiti)

30 August 2011
09:00

Vanuatu	5 – 1	Tuvalu
J. Kaltak 8', 38', 45+1', 80'; Yelou 49' (pen.)	Report	Ale 90+1'

Stade Rivière Salée, Nouméa
Referee: Rakesh Varman (Fiji)

1 September 2011
12:00

Tuvalu	0 – 8	New Caledonia
	Report	Gorendiawé 15'; Kabeu 26', 35'; Gope-Fenepej 38'; Haeko 50'; Lolohea 61'; Hmaé 67', 85'

Stade Rivière Salée, Nouméa
Referee: Chris Kerr (New Zealand)

3 September 2011
12:00

Solomon Islands	6 – 1	Tuvalu
Totori 15', 41' (pen.); Lui 23'; Naka 37', 46'; Faisi 90+1'	Report	Lepaio 78'

Stade Rivière Salée, Nouméa
Referee: Averii Jacques (Tahiti)

5 September 2011
09:00

Guam	1 – 1	Tuvalu
Cunliffe 18' (pen.)	Report	Stanley 24'

Stade Rivière Salée, Nouméa
Referee: Kader Zitouni (Tahiti)

== Tuvalu national football team at the 2019 Pacific Games ==
8 July 2019 2019 Pacific Games Group Stage	Tuvalu	0–13	Solomon Islands	Apia, Samoa
10:00		Report	Feni 12', 17', 20', 33', 60'; Nawo 24'; Totori 29', 38'; Donga 40'; Kaua 43'; Tanito 44', 73'; Hou 71'	Stadium: J.S. Blatter Stadium; Attendance: 300; Referee: Pari Oito (Tahiti)

10 July 2019 2019 Pacific Games Group Stage	Tuvalu	0–7	Tahiti	Apia, Samoa
9:00		Report	T. Tehau 8', 20' (pen.), 61'; Atani 27'; Tetauira 55'; Barbe 72'; Tehuritaua 82'	Stadium: J.S. Blatter Stadium; Attendance: 150; Referee: Clifford Daypuyat (Philippines)

12 July 2019 2019 Pacific Games Group Stage	American Samoa	1–1	Tuvalu	Apia, Samoa
9:00	Pati 70'	Report		Stadium: J.S. Blatter Stadium; Attendance: 100; Referee: Pari Oito (Tahiti)

15 July 2019 2019 Pacific Games Group Stage	Fiji	10–1	Tuvalu	Apia, Samoa
13:00	Tekiate 10'; Matarerega 15'; Rakula 44'; Wasasala 68', 87'; Vodowaqa 70', 83'; Sami 76'; Krishna 89', 90+2'	Report	Vailine 53'	Stadium: J.S. Blatter Stadium; Attendance: 250; Referee: Nadia Browning (New Zealand)

18 July 2019 2019 Pacific Games Group Stage	New Caledonia	11–0	Tuvalu	Apia, Samoa
10:00	Decoire 2', 33', 90+3'; Saïko 4', 14', 53', 60'; Nokisi 34' (o.g.); Hmaen 67', 85'; Tein-Padom 75'	Report		Stadium: J.S. Blatter Stadium; Referee: Rani Perry (Tahiti)
