= Fuamatu =

Fuamatu is a surname. Notable people with the surname include:

- Emanuele Fuamatu (born 1989), Samoan athlete
- Fila Fuamatu, Samoan powerlifter
- Joshua Fuamatu ( Born 2002 ) , Australian - Samoan Aussie Rules Player

== See also ==
- Chris Fuamatu-Maʻafala (born 1977), American football player
