= Sport in Oceania =

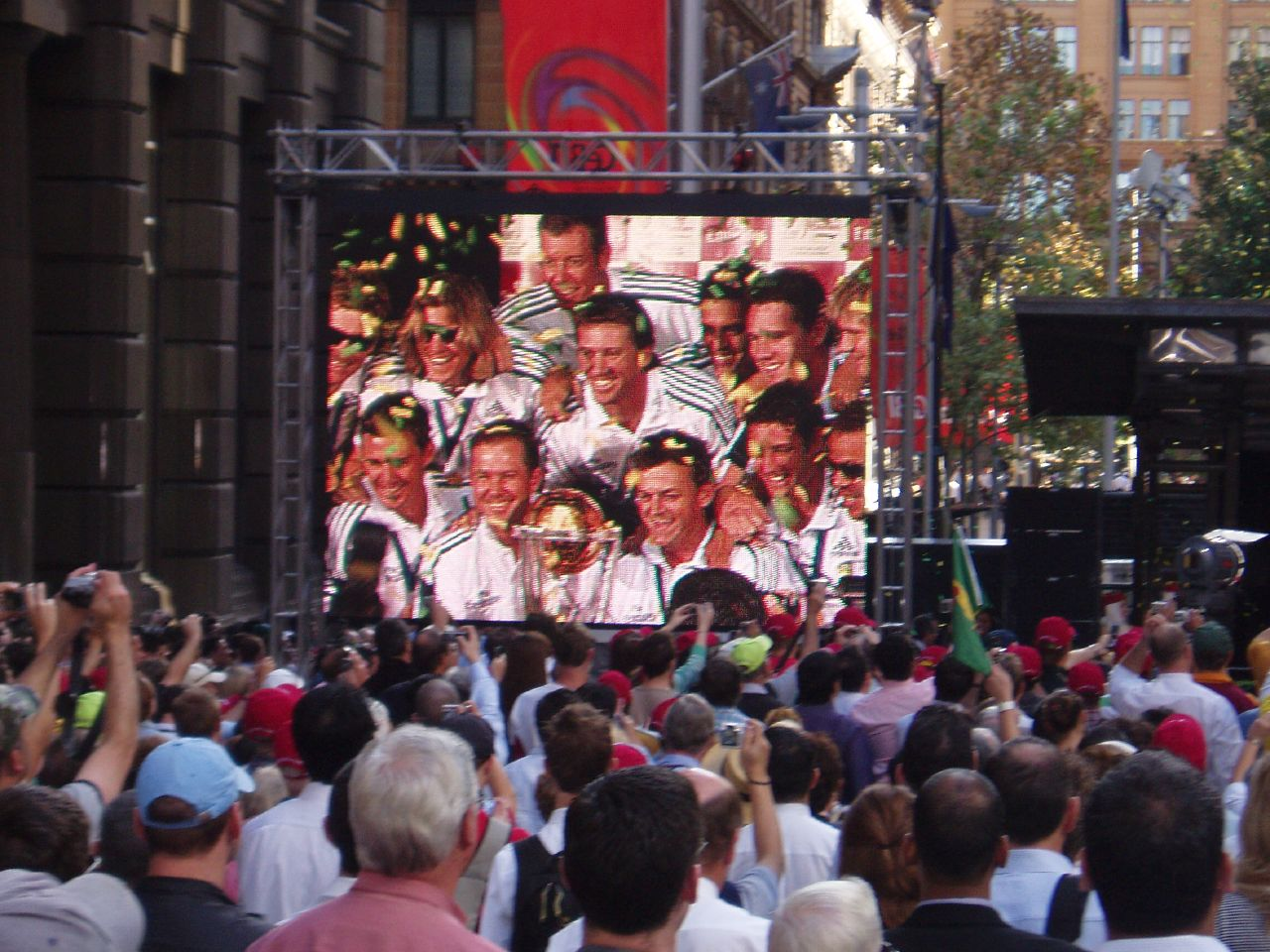
Fans welcome to the Australian team in Sydney after winning 2007 Cricket World Cup.

Sport in Oceania varies from country to country. The most popular playing sport for men in Australia is Australian rules football, while for women is netball. Rugby League is the most popular sport in terms of audiences. Rugby union is the most popular sport among New Zealanders, while in Papua New Guinea rugby league is the most popular and enjoys the highest television ratings. Cricket is another popular sport throughout the Oceania region.

== Multi-sport games ==
Australia has hosted two Summer Olympics: Melbourne 1956 and Sydney 2000. Also, Australia has hosted five editions of the Commonwealth Games (Sydney 1938, Perth 1962, Brisbane 1982, Melbourne 2006), and (Gold Coast 2018). Meanwhile, New Zealand has hosted the Commonwealth Games three times: Auckland 1950, Christchurch 1974 and Auckland 1990.

The Pacific Games (formerly known as the South Pacific Games) is a multi-sport event, much like the Olympics on a much smaller scale, with participation exclusively from countries around the Pacific. It is held every four years and began in 1963. Australia and New Zealand competed in the games for the first time in 2015.

== Association football ==
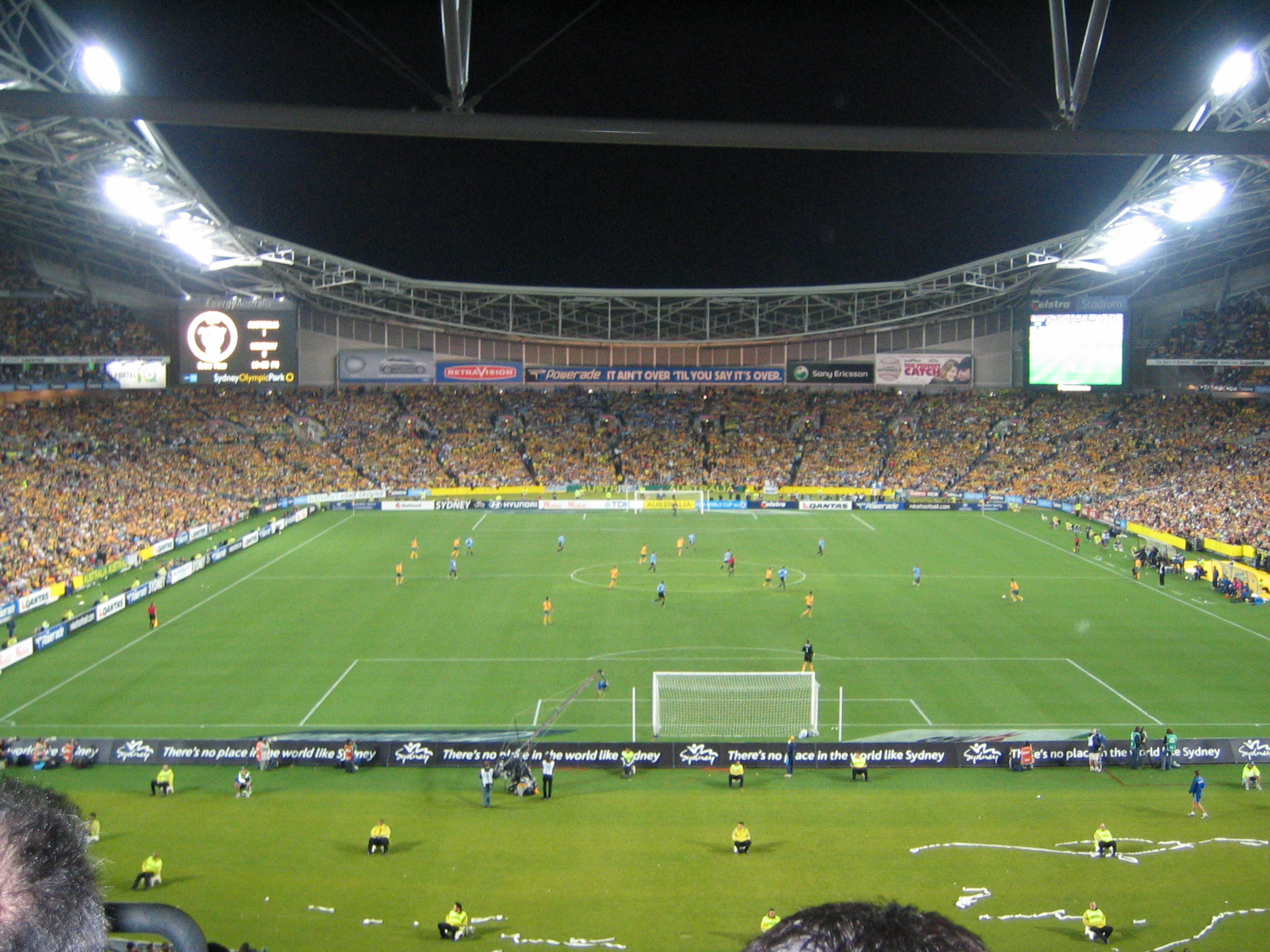
Australia against Uruguay in Stadium Australia, during the 2006 FIFA World Cup qualifying play-off

Association football is a popular sport in Oceania in terms of participation. The Oceania Football Confederation (OFC) is one of six association football confederations under the auspices of FIFA, the international governing body of the sport. The OFC is the only confederation without an automatic qualification to the World Cup. Currently the winner of the OFC qualification tournament must play-off against a team from either Asia, North America, or South America to qualify for the World Cup.

Currently, Vanuatu is the only country in Oceania to call football its national sport. However, it is the most popular sport in Kiribati, the Solomon Islands and Tuvalu, and has a significant (and growing) popularity in New Zealand. Oceania has been represented at five World Cup finals tournaments — Australia in 1974 and 2006 and New Zealand in 1982, 2010, and 2026. In 2006, Australia joined the Asian Football Confederation and qualified for the 2010 and 2014 World Cups as an Asian entrant. New Zealand qualified through the Oceania Confederation, winning its playoff against Bahrain. This made 2010 the first time that two countries from (geographic) Oceania had qualified at the same time, albeit through different confederations.

The Oceania Football Confederation was founded in 1966. It organises the FIFA World Cup qualifier, the OFC Nations Cup for national teams and the OFC Champions League for clubs. The Football Federation Australia left the OFC in 2006 to join Asian Football Confederation.

The most successful Oceanian countries in international men's competitions have been Australia, New Zealand, Fiji, Solomon Islands, Tahiti, New Caledonia, Papua New Guinea, Vanuatu, American Samoa, Samoa, Cook Islands and Tonga. In women's football, Oceanian team have been dominant, especially Australia, New Zealand, Papua New Guinea, Fiji, Samoa, Tonga, New Caledonia, Cook Islands, Solomon Islands, Vanuatu, Tahiti and American Samoa.

Football has been regularly included in the Pacific Games, the multi-sports event for Pacific nations, territories and dependencies, since 1963. Until 2011 the competition was known as the South Pacific Games. Since 1971 the men's tournament has been held every four years, but was not played in 1999 due to contractual issues.

In 2007, the men's competition doubled as the Oceania Football Confederation's preliminary qualifying competition for the 2010 FIFA World Cup. The men's tournament also became the Olympic qualifier for Oceania for the 2015 edition.

The women's tournament was introduced in 2003, and has doubled up as the preliminary qualifying competition for the Olympic Games since 2007. Football was a compulsory inclusion at the Pacific Games for men's teams for many years but was made a core sport for both men's and women's teams in 2017.

Football has also been held at several editions of the Pacific Mini Games, starting with the first tournament in 1981.

=== Fans ===
The top three most popular football clubs from Oceania as of March 2023:

#	Football club	Country	Fans
1	Sydney FC	Australia	693,000
2	Brisbane Roar	Australia	595,000
3	Melbourne Victory	Australia	590,000

=== Attendances ===
The association football clubs from Oceania with an average home league attendance of at least 10,000 in the 2024–25 and 2025 seasons:

#	Club	Country	Average
1	Auckland FC	New Zealand	18,101
2	Sydney FC	Australia	15,282
3	Melbourne Victory	Australia	12,778
4	Adelaide United	Australia	10,575

== Australian rules football ==
Australian rules football is most popular in Australia and is the most popular football code in Australia in terms of attendance. It has a modest following in Papua New Guinea. It is the national sport of Nauru.

== Basketball ==
Basketball is notably popular in Australia and New Zealand, in terms of their national leagues and teams, participation, as well as the NBA. Australia has its own basketball league called the NBL (National Basketball League) which New Zealand competes in as well. The Australian national team (sometimes referred to as the Boomers) as of 2016 was ranked 4th in the 2016 Summer Olympics, and New Zealand (also known as the Tall Blacks) are ranked 29th according to FIBA. It is the 4th most popular sport in terms of participation in New Zealand and is the 3rd most popular in Australia. Australia has had a lot of NBA players, such as Andrew Bogut, Ben Simmons, Matthew Dellavedova, and Patty Mills. New Zealand has also helped to create some NBA players as well, such as Kirk Penney, Steven Adams, and Sean Marks.

== Cricket ==
Cricket is one of the most prominent sports in Oceania. Australia had ruled International cricket as the number one team for more than a decade, and have won six Cricket World Cups and have been runner-up for two times, making them the most successful cricket team. New Zealand is also considered a strong competitor in the sport, with the New Zealand cricket team, also called the Black Caps, enjoying success in many competitions. Both Australia and New Zealand are Full members of the ICC.

Fiji, Vanuatu and Papua New Guinea are some of the Associate/Affiliate members of the ICC in Oceania that are governed by ICC East Asia-Pacific. Backyard cricket and Beach cricket, which are simplified variants of cricket played at home or on a sand beach, are also popular recreational sports in Australia. Forms of cricket that have been adapted to local cultures are played in Oceania, such as Trobriand cricket in the Trobriand Islands and Kilikiti in Samoa, Tuvalu and in other Pacific Islands.

Cricket is culturally a significant sport for summer in Oceania. The Boxing Day Test is very popular in Australia, conducted every year on 26 December at the Melbourne Cricket Ground, Melbourne.

== Rugby league ==
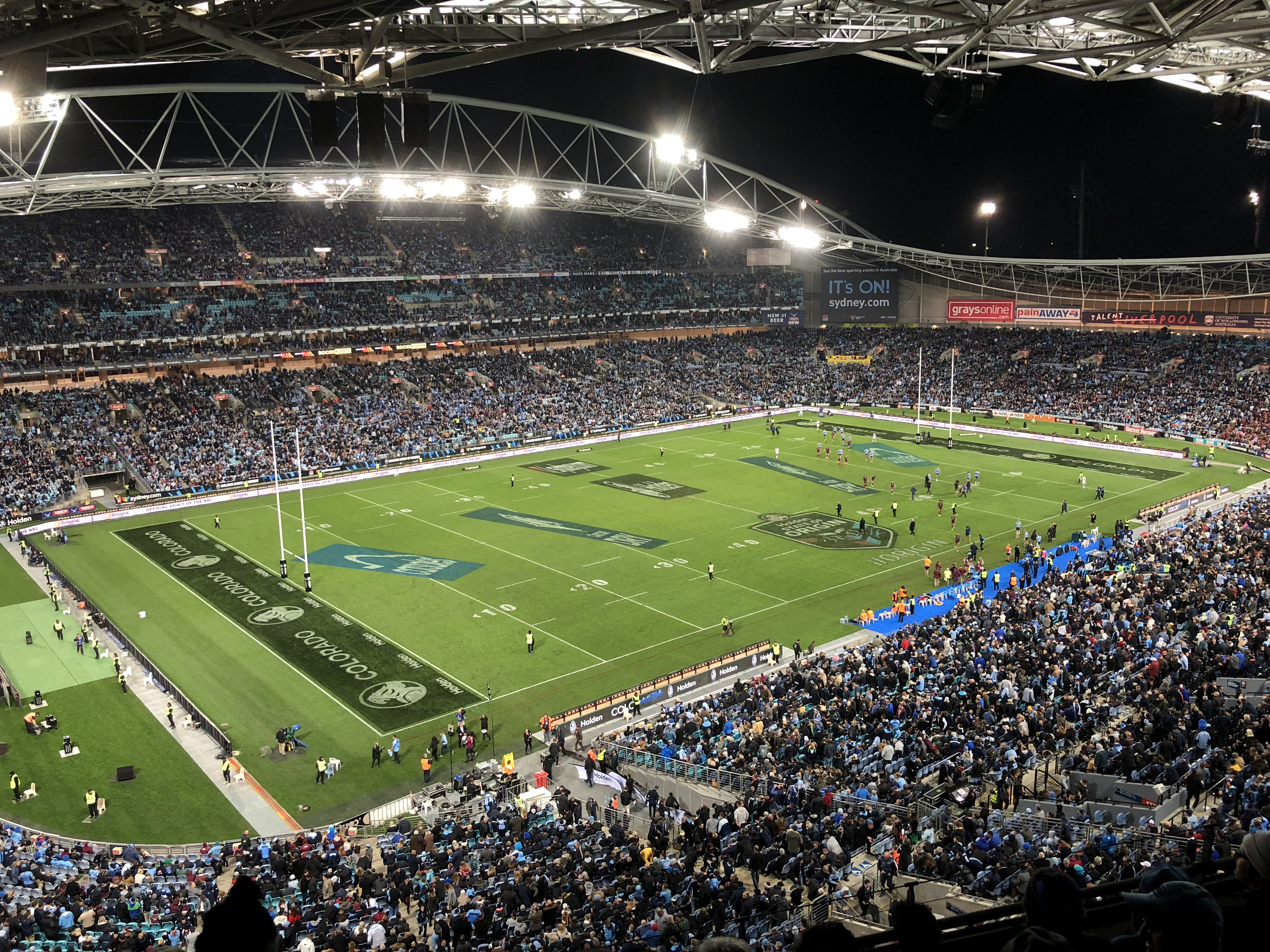
A State of Origin game in 2018 at Stadium Australia

Rugby league is the national sport of Papua New Guinea (the second-most populous country in Oceania after Australia) and has the largest overall audience of any sport in Australia. It attracts significant attention across New Zealand and the Pacific Islands.

Australia and New Zealand are two of the most successful sides in the world. Australia has won the Rugby League World Cup a record eleven times while New Zealand won their first World Cup in 2008. Australia hosted the second tournament in 1957. Australia and New Zealand jointly hosted it in 1968 and 1977. New Zealand hosted the final for the first time in 1985–1988 tournament and Australia hosted the tournament again in 2008. In 2017 the tournament was jointly host by Australia, New Zealand and Papua New Guinea.

The Fiji national rugby league team, nicknamed the Bati (pronounced [mˈbatʃi]), represents Fiji in the sport of rugby league football and has been participating in international competition since 1992. It has competed in the Rugby League World Cup on three occasions, with their best results coming when they made consecutive semi-final appearances in the 2008 Rugby League World Cup and 2013 Rugby League World Cup. The team also competes in the Pacific Cup.

=== Tournaments ===
Club

- See list

Representative

- Rugby League World Cup
- Rugby League Pacific Championships
- State of Origin series
- Anzac Test (defunct)
- Pacific Cup (defunct)
- Rugby League Tri-Nations (defunct)
- Rugby League Four Nations (defunct)

== Rugby union ==
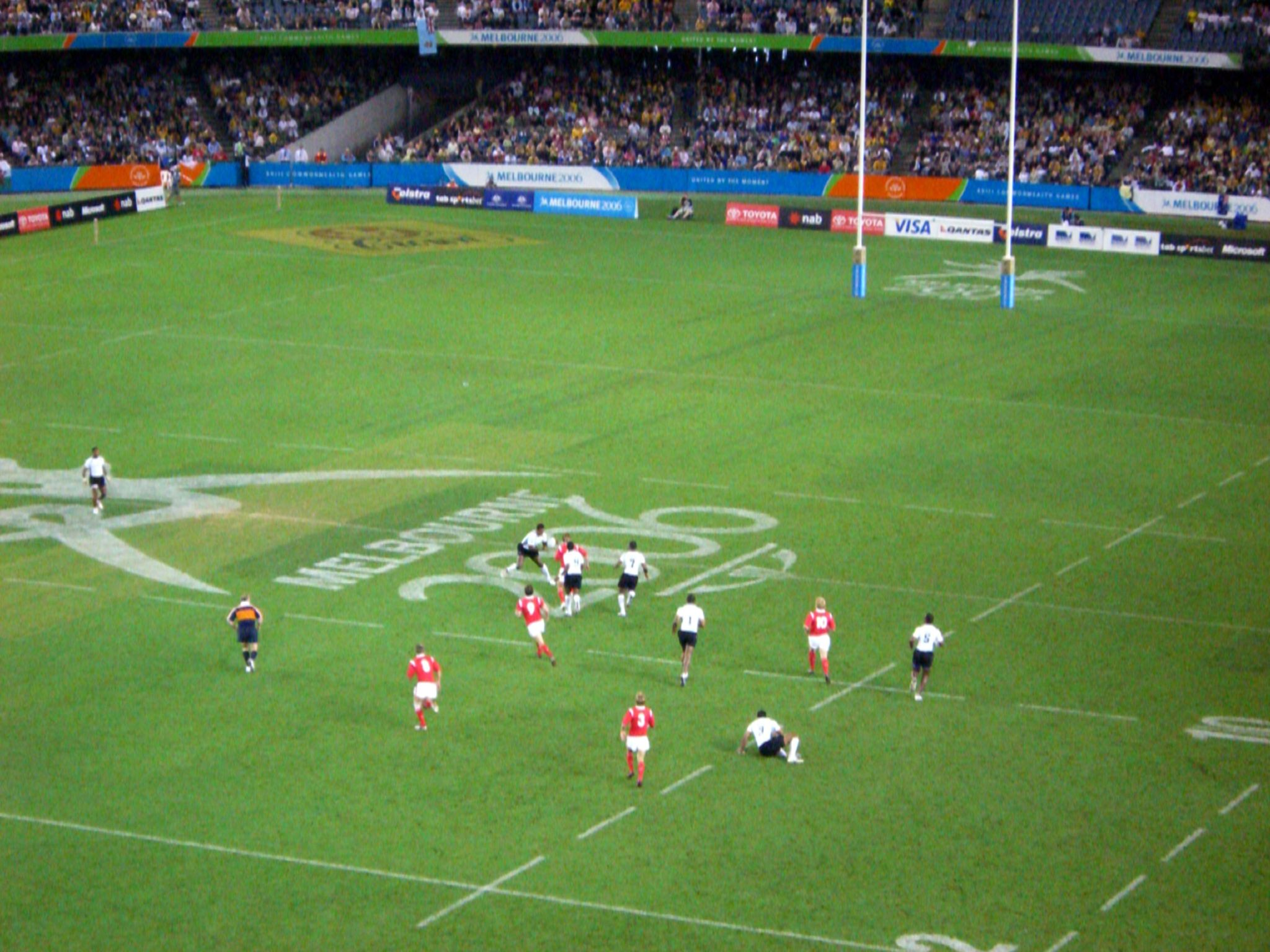
Fiji playing Wales at seven-a-side rugby

Rugby union is the national sport of New Zealand, Samoa, Fiji and Tonga. Fiji's sevens team is one of the most successful in the world, as is New Zealand's. The Fiji national sevens side is a popular and successful international rugby sevens team, and has won the Hong Kong Sevens a record fifteen times since its inception in 1976.

New Zealand has won the Rugby World Cup a record three times, and were the first nation to win back to back World Cups. New Zealand won the inaugural Rugby World Cup in 1987 which was hosted by Australia and New Zealand. Australia hosted it in 2003 and New Zealand was the host and won it in 2011. New Zealand also won in 2015, defeating Australia in the final. The Super Rugby features five teams from each of Australia and New Zealand.

Rugby union is the national sport of Tonga, and the national team (ʻIkale Tahi, or Sea Eagles) has performed quite well on the international stage. Tonga has competed in six Rugby World Cups since 1987. The 2007 and 2011 Rugby World Cups were Tonga's most successful to date, both winning two out of four matches and in a running chance for the quarter-finals.

=== Attendances ===
In the 2025 league season, three rugby union clubs from Oceania recorded an average home league attendance of at least 10,000:

#	Club	Country	Average
1	Waratahs	Australia	20,572
2	Highlanders	New Zealand	13,286
3	Chiefs	New Zealand	11,245

=== Tournaments ===
- Oceania Rugby
- The Rugby Championship
- World Rugby Pacific Nations Cup
- Oceania Rugby Cup
- Oceania Sevens
- Super Rugby
- Mitre 10 Cup
- National Rugby Championship

== Largest stadiums in Oceania outside Australia and New Zealand ==
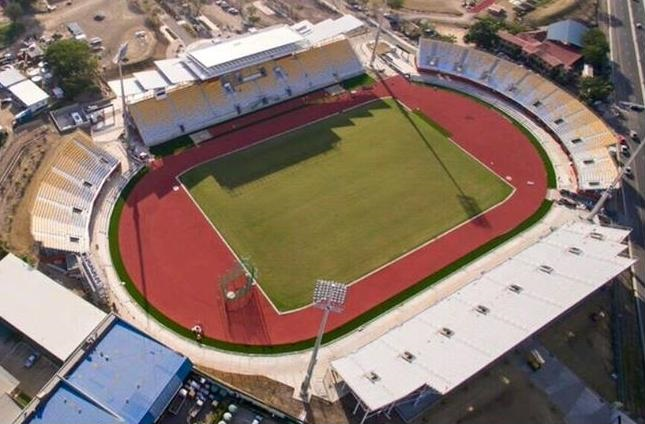
Sir John Guise Stadium

Rank	Stadium	Capacity	City	Country
1	Sir Hubert Murray Stadium	25,000	Port Moresby	Papua New Guinea
2	Sir John Guise Stadium	15,000	Port Moresby	Papua New Guinea
3	HFC Bank Stadium	15,000	Suva	Fiji
4	PNG Football Stadium	14,800	Port Moresby	Papua New Guinea
5	Lawaqa Park	12,000	Sigatoka	Fiji
6	Apia Park	12,000	Apia	Samoa
7	Churchill Park	10,000	Lautoka	Fiji
8	Subrail Park	10,000	Labasa	Fiji
9	Stade Hamuta	10,000	Papeete	French Polynesia
10	Stade Numa-Daly Magenta	10,000	Noumea	New Caledonia
11	Pacific Games Stadium	10,000	Honiara	Solomon Islands
12	Teufaiva Sport Stadium	10,000	Nuku'alofa	Tonga

== See also ==
- Culture of Oceania
- Sport in Africa
- Sport in Asia
- Sport in Europe
- Sport in North America
- Sport in South America
