= Tuvalu Weightlifting Federation =

Tuvaluan sporting organization

- Sport: Weightlifting
- Abbreviation: TWF
- Founded: 2013
- Affiliation: International Weightlifting Federation (IWF)
- Regional affiliation: Oceania Weightlifting Federation (OWF)
- Headquarters: Vaiaku, Funafuti
- President: Mr. Iona Talavai
- Vice president: Mr. Uluao Lauti
- Secretary: Ms. Kaie Luenita
- Coach: Mr. Bryce Moses
- (Tuvalu)

The Tuvalu Weightlifting Federation (TWF) is the organisation recognised by the International Weightlifting Federation as the weightlifting federation of Tuvalu.

== History ==
The Tuvalu Weightlifting Federation (TWF) staged its first national competition on 2 July 2013 as part of the Tuvalu Games. The Tuvalu Athletics Association (TAA) allowed the TWF to organized the weightlifting competition, although the event was not sanctioned by the International Weightlifting Federation (IWF). The competition involved 6 females and 18 males. The formation of the TWF follows the success of Tuvaluan weightlifters at international competitions. Logona Esau was the first athlete from Tuvalu to win a medal at an international competition, when he took bronze at the 2005 South Pacific Mini Games in the 62 kg male division, In 2007, he won a silver medal in the men's 69 kg clean and jerk at the Pacific Games, lifting 141 kg. Esau also represented Tuvalu at the 2006 Commonwealth Games and also represented Tuvalu at the 2008 Summer Olympics. Ioane Haumili and Tuau Lapua Lapua represented Tuvalu at the 2010 Commonwealth Games.

Ioane Haumili and Logona Esau have trained at the Oceania Weightlifting Institute and they have assisted in the coaching of Tuvaluan weightlifters. Uluao Lauti, who is a former weightlifting representative of Tuvalu, has also assisted during training. Lauti had participated in the Oceania Regional Coaching Workshop in 2003, and is recognized as a Commonwealth international referee.

At the 2013 Pacific Mini Games, Tuau Lapua Lapua won Tuvalu's first gold medal in an international competition in the weightlifting 62 kg snatch, male division. (He also won bronze in the clean and jerk, and obtained the silver medal overall for the combined event.)

In 2015 the TWF sent a team to the Commonwealth Youth Games. The TWF prepared a team for the 2015 Pacific Games held in Port Moresby, Papua New Guinea. Thirteen athletes qualified in weightlifting to represent Tuvalu at the 2015 Pacific Games and the Senior, Youth & Junior Oceania Weightlifting Championships 2015, which were held same time as the competition for weightlifting at the 2015 Pacific Games.

== Notable Tuvaluan weightlifters ==
- Logona Esau: 62 kg male division, combined event at the 2005 South Pacific Mini Games; 69 kg clean and jerk at the Pacific Games, lifting 141 kg.
- Tuau Lapua Lapua: 62 kg clean and jerk, male division, 62 kg Snatch, male division; and 62 kg combined event in weightlifting at the 2011 Pacific Games; and 62 kg; snatch; 62 kg clean and jerk; and for the combined event at the 2013 Pacific Mini Games.
- Manuila Raobu: 62 kg Weightlifting – Snatch at the 2017 Pacific Mini Games, and also in Weightlifting at the 2022 Pacific Mini Games: 73 kg Snatch, 73 kg Total. In the 2022 Oceania Championships, 73 kg division, Manuila Raobu was also a gold medalist:.
- Manuila Raobu in Weightlifting at the 2023 Pacific Games: 73 kg Snatch - 125 kg, 73 kg Clean & jerk - 152 kg, 73 kg Total - 277 kg.

== Affiliations ==
- Tuvalu Athletics Association (TAA)
- Oceania Weightlifting Federation (OWF)
- Commonwealth Weightlifting Federation (CWF)
- International Weightlifting Federation (IWF)
