= Tuvalu Powerlifting Federation =

Sports governing body in Tuvalu

- Sport: Powerlifting
- Abbreviation: TPF
- Founded: 2013
- Affiliation: International Powerlifting Federation (IPF) provisional member
- Regional affiliation: Oceania
- Headquarters: Vaiaku, Funafuti
- President: Uluao Lauti
- Coach: Mr. Liai Liai Mataio (2016)
- (Tuvalu)

The Tuvalu Powerlifting Federation (TPF) is the organisation recognised by the International Powerlifting Federation as the powerlifting federation of Tuvalu.

== History ==
Tuvalu qualified 15 athletes in powerlifting to represent Tuvalu at the 2015 Pacific Games. Telupe Iosefa received the first ever gold medal won by Tuvalu at the Pacific Games in the powerlifting 120 kg male division with a total of 805.0 kg.

Telupe Iosefa achieved a personal best of 851 kg at 120 kg at the 2016 Asia/Oceania Championships held in Christchurch, New Zealand.

== Notable Tuvaluan powerlifters ==
- Telupe Iosefa: 120 kg male division with a total of 805.0 kg in Powerlifting at the 2015 Pacific Games. This was an Oceania/Commonwealth Powerlifting Federation record; 105 kg male division with a total of 647.5 kg at the 2013 Commonwealth Men's Powerlifting Championships, Auckland, New Zealand; 120 kg male division in Powerlifting at the 2019 Pacific Games.
- Teofoga Edueni Sonya Dabwido: 84 kg female division, with a total of 332.5 kg in Powerlifting at the 2015 Pacific Games.
- Asenate Manoa: 72 kg female division, with a total of 340 kg in Powerlifting at the 2015 Pacific Games.

== Affiliations ==
- Tuvalu Athletics Association (TAA)
- Commonwealth Powerlifting Federation (CPF)
- International Powerlifting Federation (IPF)
