= UEPA =

UEPA may be:

- Pará State University
- Ukrainian Engineering Pedagogics Academy
- Uepa (surname)
