= Tuvalu at the 2011 Pacific Games =

- Flag of Tuvalu
- National federation: Tuvalu Association of Sports and National Olympic Committee

Pacific Games appearances (overview)
- 1979; 1983–1995; 1999; 2003; 2007; 2011; 2015; 2019; 2023

Tuvalu competed at the 2011 Pacific Games in Nouméa, New Caledonia between 27 August and 10 September 2011. As of June 28, 2011 Tuvalu has listed 90 competitors.

== Athletics ==
Tuvalu qualified 2 athletes.

Men

- Okilani Tinilau

Women

- Asenate Manoa

== Badminton ==
Tuvalu qualified 3 athletes.

Men

- Felo Feoto
- Kasipe Galuega

Women

- Teuteuga Fasiai

== Football ==
Tuvalu qualified a men's team. Each team can consist of a maximum of 21 athletes.

Men

- Katepu Sieni
- Kolone Pokia
- Alamoana Tofuola
- Etimoni Timuani
- Ali Takataka
- Mau Penisula
- Vaisua Liva
- Okilani Tinilau
- Lutelu Tiute
- James Lepaio
- George Panapa
- Togavai Stanley
- Raj Sogivalu
- Faiana Ofati
- Uota Ale
- Meauma Petaia
- Akelei Limaalofa
- Lopati Okelani
- Joshua Tapasei

== Powerlifting ==
Tuvalu qualified 1 athlete.

Men

- Nakibae Kitiseni - 5th in the 74 kg division

== Rugby Sevens ==
Tuvalu qualified a men's team. Each team can consist of a maximum of 12 athletes.

Men

- Salemona Tefana
- Luagigie Taitaiga
- Vete Telina Ofati
- Talia Vaitiu
- Patiliki Patiliki
- Patelu Paisi
- Semalie Telavaha Fotu
- Tulumani Talia
- Teriaua Koio
- Olaalofa Eliu
- Eric Maatia Toafa
- Afaaso Sanaila Bici

== Tennis ==
Tuvalu qualified 2 athletes.

Men

- Iakopo Molotii

Women

- Saintly Alesi Molotii

== Volleyball ==
=== Indoor Volleyball ===
Tuvalu qualified a men's and women's team. Each team can consist of a maximum of 12 members.

Men

- Paenui Fagota
- Sioni Koum
- Afemai Lopati Sigano
- Ikapoti Kaisami sunset
- Sanelivi Viliamu
- Jay Timo
- Pelosi Solofa
- Siopepa Tailolo

Women

- Lillian Tusitala
- Fuligafou Vaega
- Foma Kalala
- Lilly Lafita
- Sagalei Uila
- Esther Koulapi
- Matagimalie Evagelia
- Loise Sumeo
- Tongauea Teikale
- Teala Enele

== Weightlifting ==
Tuvalu qualified 1 athlete.

Men

- Tuau Lapua Lapua - -62 kg Snatch, -62 kg Total, -62 kg Clean & Jerk.
