= Nuʻuuli Mose =

Samoan athlete

Sport
- Country: Samoa
- Sport: Boxing
Medal record
Men's Boxing
Representing Samoa
Pacific Games
| Gold medal – first place | 2019 Apia | Lightweight |
Pacific Mini Games
| Gold medal – first place | 2017 Port Vila | Lightweight |

Nuʻuuli Mose Livai is a Samoan boxer who has represented Samoa in the Pacific Games and Pacific Mini Games.

At the 2017 Pacific Mini Games in Port Vila, Vanuatu he won Gold in the lightweight division. He won another gold in the same class at the 2019 Pacific Games in Apia.

In August 2019 he was convicted of burglary and theft. He was sentenced to 300 hours community service.
