= Sally Yee =

Fijian table tennis player (born 2001)

Personal information
- Nationality: Fiji
- Born: April 10, 2001 (age 25)
- Height: 1.7 m (5 ft 7 in)
- Weight: 60 kg (132 lb)

Sport
- Sport: Table tennis
- Rank: 241 (April 2020)
Medal record
Table Tennis
Representing Fiji
Pacific Games
| Silver medal – second place | 2019 Pacific Games | Singles |
| Silver medal – second place | 2019 Pacific Games | Doubles |
| Silver medal – second place | 2019 Pacific Games | Team |
| Bronze medal – third place | 2019 Pacific Games | Mix |

Sally Yee (born April 10, 2001) is a Fijian table tennis player who represented Fiji at the 2020 Summer Olympics. She also competed in the 2016 Summer Olympics in the women's singles event. She won 3 silver medals and a bronze at the 2019 Pacific Games.

== Career ==
Fiji entered her into the table tennis competition at the 2016 Summer Olympic Games for the first time in the nation's Olympic history. She secured a spot in the women's singles by virtue of her top three finish at the 2016 Oceania Qualification Tournament in Bendigo, Australia. However she was eliminated in the preliminary round after competing against Offiong Edem. In 2018, she was awarded Fiji Tattslotto Sportswomen of the year in which she dedicated her achievements to her parents and coach. In January 2021, she officially pulled out of the 2020 Tokyo Olympics due to "personal reasons". In June 2021, she pulled back and was confirmed to represent Fiji at the Olympics. She was eliminated in the preliminary round against Chelsea Edghill.

== Personal life ==
Sally has a sister Grace Yee, with which they competed together in the Women's doubles and team events in the 2019 Pacific Games. She attended Jai Narayan College in Fiji before moving to Japan to further her education. In Japan, she studied English at Chinzei Gakuin High School and took part in local competitions in the Nagasaki prefecture. Prior in giving birth in April 2021, Yee trained throughout her pregnancy for the 2020 Summer Olympics coached by her own mother Harvi Yee.
