= Matile Sitagata =

Samoan weightlifter

Personal information
- Born: August 17, 1992 (age 33) Faga'alu, American Samoa
- Occupations: Brand Ambassador and Digital Mobile Money Consultant for Digicel Samoa.
Medal record
IPF Junior World Championships
Gold medal – first place	2013 Suzdal	Squat
Gold medal – first place	2013 Suzdal	Deadlift
Gold medal – first place	2013 Suzdal	Total
Silver medal – second place	2013 Suzdal	BP
Gold medal – first place	2014 Potchefstroom	Squat
Gold medal – first place	2014 Potchefstroom	Deadlift
Gold medal – first place	2014 Potchefstroom	Total
Bronze medal – third place	2014 Potchefstroom	BP
Oceania Junior Championships
Gold medal – first place	2012 Sydney	Total
Gold medal – first place	2013 Auckland	Total
Oceania Open Championships
Gold medal – first place	2014 Melbourne	Squat
Gold medal – first place	2014 Melbourne	Deadlift
Gold medal – first place	2014 Melbourne	Total
Silver medal – second place	2014 Melbourne	BP
Pacific Games
Gold medal – first place	2015 Port Moresby	Total

Matile Sitagata (born August 17, 1992) is a Samoan Oceania, Pacific Games and Junior World Champion in the sport of powerlifting.

Matile only started training for powerlifting after the 2011 Pacific Games which were held in Nouméa, New Caledonia in September. At her first powerlifting competition in December 2011 it was obvious that she was a real talent and that she was going to be a great champion. Her first international competition was in December 2012 at the Oceania Powerlifting Championships where she exploded onto the scene with a gold medal in the Junior 84+kg class and a new Junior World Record in the deadlift of 220 kg.

At her first World Championships held in Suzdal Russia Matile won Gold in the 84+kg class with 455 kg Total and was crowned Junior World Champion for the first time. Later that year in Auckland New Zealand she again won the Oceania Junior Champion trophy in the 84+kg class and also came away with the Best Junior lifter award.

She retained her Junior World crown in June 2014 in Potchefstroom, South Africa. Later that year in Melbourne she won her first Open Oceania title in the 84+kg class though she was still a junior and smashed her own Junior WR set in 2012 with an easy 222.5 kg second attempt.

In 2015, she was denied the chance to win her third Junior World crown in Finland due to funding limitations but made up for this by breaking numerous records in Port Moresby PNG at the 2015 Pacific Games. Besides winning the gold medal in the 84+kg class she set four Junior World Records and broke an Open WR with 237.5 kg in the deadlift.
