= Powerlifting at the 2011 Pacific Games =

- Location: Nouméa, New Caledonia
- Dates: 8–9 September 2011

Powerlifting at the 2011 Pacific Games in Nouméa, New Caledonia were held on September 8–9, 2011.

== Medal summary ==
=== Medal table ===
Rank	Nation	Gold	Silver	Bronze	Total
1	Papua New Guinea	6	3	1	10
2	Samoa	3	1	0	4
3	Fiji	2	3	6	11
4	New Caledonia	2	3	0	5
5	Nauru	1	2	3	6
6	French Polynesia (TAH)	0	3	0	3
Totals (6 entries)		14	15	10	39

=== Men ===
Event	Gold	Silver	Bronze
–59 kg	Kalau Andrew; Papua New Guinea	Kelly Hendry; Papua New Guinea	Not awarded
–66 kg	Maselai Wan; Papua New Guinea	Karyl Le Van N'Gon; New Caledonia	Koroi Vu Waqavakaviti; Fiji
–74 kg	Kenny Naime; Papua New Guinea	Emosi Baleinuku; Fiji	Awama Johnson Aemoge; Papua New Guinea
–83 kg	Livingstone Sikoli; Papua New Guinea	Renack Mau; Nauru	Riga Tauhove; Fiji
–93 kg	Raboe Roland; Nauru	Fredo Lecren; New Caledonia	Jolame Rasovo; Fiji
–105 kg	Ofisa Ofisa; Samoa	Joash Teabuge; Nauru	Greg Garoa; Nauru
–120 kg	Tavita Lipine; Samoa	Andy Faremiro; Tahiti	Jesse Jeremiah; Nauru
+120 kg	Oliva Kirisome; Samoa	Edwin Tamatoa Tauhiro; Tahiti	Jezza Uepa; Nauru

=== Women ===
Event	Gold	Silver	Bronze
–52 kg	Jacqueline Caco; New Caledonia	Mary Peto; Papua New Guinea	Mozima Hussain; Fiji
–57 kg	Stéphanie Tiemonhu; New Caledonia	Hitolo Kevau; Papua New Guinea	Not awarded
–63 kg	Melissa Tikio; Papua New Guinea	Lidie Tiemonhou; New Caledonia	Suliana Kolitagane; Fiji
–72 kg	Linda Pulsan; Papua New Guinea	Moeata Caterine Richmond; Tahiti	Not awarded
–84 kg	Elesi Ikanidrodro; Fiji	Fila Fuamatu; Samoa	Ana Garnett; Fiji
+84 kg	Senimili Turner; Fiji	Helen Pahulu; Fiji	Not awarded
