= Ioane Hawaii =

Tuvaluan para table tennis player and disability rights activist

Sport
- Country: Tuvalu
- Sport: Table tennis
Medal record
Men's Table tennis
Representing Tuvalu
Pacific Games
Gold medal – first place	2019 Apia	Seated

Ioane Hawaii is a Tuvaluan para table tennis player and disability rights activist who has represented Tuvalu at the Pacific Games.

Hawaii studied at the University of the South Pacific on an Australia Awards scholarship, graduating in 2021 with a diploma in economics. He began playing table tennis in 2014.

In 2017 he competed in the Oceania Para Table Tennis Championships.

At the 2019 Pacific Games in Apia he won gold in the men's seated singles table tennis, becoming the first Tuvaluan to win gold in the table tennis events, and the second Tuvaluan gold medal winner at the Pacific Games.

At the 2023 Pacific Games, he participated in the Men's Team, Singles Seated Male and Men’s Singles events.
