= Tuvalu Athletics Association =

Governing body for athletics in Tuvalu

- Sport: Athletics
- Abbreviation: TAA
- Founded: 2004
- Affiliation: IAAF
- Affiliation date: 2008
- Regional affiliation: OAA
- Headquarters: Vaiaku, Funafuti
- President: Monise Laafai
- Vice president: Teake Esene Manatu
- Secretary: Tovia Tovia
- (Tuvalu)

The Tuvalu Athletics Association (TAA) is the governing body for the sport of athletics in the Tuvalu.

== History ==
A combined Gilbert and Ellice Islands team participated already at the 1963, 1966, and 1971 South Pacific Games. An athlete from Tuvalu (then Ellice Islands), namely Nelu Arenga, is at least documented for 1971.

Athletes from Tuvalu attended the 2003 South Pacific Games for the first time.

The official foundation of TAA occurred in 2004, and its affiliation to the IAAF occurred in 2008.

The current president is Monise Laafai.

== Participation in international events ==
Tuvaluan athletes participate in the Pacific Games and the Commonwealth Games in track and field events such as the discus, shot put and 100 metre sprints. Tuvaluan athletes have also participated in the men's and women's 100 metre sprints at the IAAF World Championships in Athletics from 2009.

The Tuvalu Association of Sports and National Olympic Committee (TASNOC) was recognised as a National Olympic Committee in July 2007. Tuvalu competed at their inaugural Olympic Games at the Beijing 2008 Summer Olympics, with a weightlifter and two athletes in the men's and women's 100-metre sprints. A team with athletes in the same events competed at the 2012 Summer Olympics.

== Affiliations ==
- International Association of Athletics Federations (IAAF)
- Oceania Athletics Association (OAA)

Moreover, it is part of the following national organisations:

- Tuvalu Association of Sports and National Olympic Committee (TASNOC)

Other Tuvaluan sports organisations:

- Tuvalu Weightlifting Federation (TWF)
- Tuvalu Powerlifting Federation (TPF)

== National records ==
TAA maintains the Tuvaluan records in athletics.
