= Tuvalu A-Division (women) =

- Founded: 2009
- Country: Tuvalu
- Confederation: OFC
- Relegation to: none
- Current champions: Nauti
- Most championships: Tamanuku (2)

The Tuvalu A-Division for women is the top level women's football league in Tuvalu. The league is organized by the Tuvalu National Football Association.

The league was founded in 2009.

It's unclear whether Women's A-Division has been played since 2014.

== List of Women’s League Champions ==
- 2009: Tamanuku
- 2010: Tofaga
- 2011: Not held
- 2012: Tamanuku
- 2013: Nui
- 2014: Nauti
- 2015-2020: Unknown
- 2021: Nauti
- 2022-2025: Unknown
- 2026: Nauti

== List of Women’s Cup Winners ==
- Independence Cup
  - 2013: Tofaga 1-0 Nui
  - 2020: Funafuti
  - 2021:
  - 2022: Funafuti
  - 2023: Nauti
- NBT Cup
  - 2013: Tamanuku 1-0 Nui
  - 2021: Nauti 1-1 Taumeana (4-1 pen)
  - 2022:
  - 2023:
- Tuvalu Games
  - 2011: Tamanuku 1-0 Tofaga
  - 2012: Tamanuku 1-1 Nauti (3-1 pen)
  - 2013: Nauti 0-0 Nui (3-2 pen)
  - 2014: Nui 1-0 Niutao
- Christmas Cup
  - 2013: Tofaga 1-0 Nauti
  - 2020: Nauti
  - 2021: Nauti
  - 2022: not held
  - 2023: not held
- Tutokotasi Cup
  - 2023: Valoa 3-0 Nauti

== Teams ==
=== 2013 season ===
The 2013 season was played by 4 women's teams:

Club	Island
Nauti	Funafuti
Tamanuku	Nukufetau
Tofaga	Vaitupu
Vaoloa	Nui

Pos	Team	Pld	W	D	L	GF	GA	GD	Pts
1	Vaoloa	3	2	1	0	2	0	+2	7
2	Nauti	3	1	1	1	1	3	−2	4
3	Tamanuku	3	0	3	0	1	1	0	3
4	Tofaga	3	0	1	2	0	0	0	1

Updated to match(es) played on 5 March 2013. Source:
Rules for classification: 1) points; 2) goal difference; 3) number of goals scored.

Vaoloa, Nauti, Tamanuku and Tofaga participated in the women's football competition at the Independence Cup.

Vaoloa, Nauti, Tamanuku, Tofaga and Manu Laeva participated in the women's football competition at the NBT Cup and the Tuvalu Games.

Vaoloa, Nauti, Tamanuku, Tofaga and Lakena United participated in the women's football competition at Christmas Cup.

=== 2014 season ===
The 2014 Tuvalu A-Division (women) was the 6th season of top flight association football in Tuvalu. The league was won by Nauti. This was probably also the last time Women's A-Division has been played.

=== 2023 season ===
Malefatuga, Moangare and Tamanuku participated in the women's football competition at the Independence Cup in 2023.

Fongafale and Nauti were the only two clubs participating in the women's NBT Cup in 2023.

Kaumaile United, Nauti, NTO United, Tamanuku, Tofaga and Vaoloa participated in a new women's football cup competition, the Tutokotasi Cup in 2023.

Location of the represented clubs (islands) in the 2012 A-Division

Club	Island
Nauti	Funafuti
Tamanuku	Nukufetau
Tofaga	Vaitupu
Niutao	Niutao
Lakena United A	Nanumea
