= Ofisa Ofisa =

Samoan weightlifter (born 1974)

Personal information
- Born: April 6, 1974 (age 52) Apia, Samoa
- Occupation: ITC Consultant for Digicel Samoa.
Medal record
Commonwealth Games
Silver medal – second place	2002 Manchester	C&J
Bronze medal – third place	2002 Manchester	Total
South Pacific Games
Gold medal – first place	1991 PNG	Snatch
Gold medal – first place	1991 PNG	C&J
Gold medal – first place	1991 PNG	Total
Gold medal – first place	1999 Guam	Snatch
Gold medal – first place	1999 Guam	C&J
Gold medal – first place	1999 Guam	Total
Pacific Games Powerlifting
Gold medal – first place	2011 Noumea	Total
Gold medal – first place	2015 Port Moresby	Total

Ofisa Ofisa (born April 6, 1974 in Apia, Samoa), also known as Ofisa Junior Asiata, is a Samoan Oceania and South Pacific Games Champion in weightlifting and powerlifting.

He won four Oceania Championships, two South Pacific Games Championships (1991 and 1999) and has set numerous Oceania and South Pacific records. At one time he held 5 South Pacific records in two different weight classes. In his final appearance at the 2002 Commonwealth Games he got a silver in the "clean and jerk" and a bronze in the "total" for the 85 kg class. Ofisa competed in the 1996 and 2000 Summer Olympics, placing 18th in the 76 kg in 1996 and the 85 kg in 2000.

Since 2007 he has been competing in the sport of powerlifting. He placed 4th at the 2007 South Pacific Games in the 100 kg class and 3rd in the Commonwealth Powerlifting Championships held that same year. He again placed 4th in the 100 kg class at the Oceania Championships held in Tahiti in 2008 but finally broke through to win in the 2010 Oceania Champs held in Apia, Samoa. He also won the 2011 Pacific Games 105 kg powerlifting gold medal with a raw 740 kg total. In 2012 he again won the Oceania powerlifting championships held in Sydney but this time in the 93 kg class.

After retiring for two years after the 2012 Oceania Championships, Ofisa made a comeback in late 2014 and won a silver medal in the 93 kg class at the Oceania Powerlifting Championships held in Melbourne. In 2015 he retained his Pacific Games crown but now in the lighter 93 kg category.
