= Uepa (surname) =

Uepa is a Nauruan surname. Notable individuals with the surname include:

- Jezza Uepa (born 1980), Nauruan powerlifter
- Maximina Uepa (born 2002), Nauruan weightlifter
