= Heimata Neuffer =

French Polynesian boxer (d. 2020)

Sport
- Country: French Polynesia
- Sport: Boxing
Medal record
Men's Boxing
Representing Tahiti
Pacific Games
| Bronze medal – third place | 2019 Apia | Heavyweight |
| Gold medal – first place | 2015 Port Moresby | Heavyweight |
Representing Tahiti
Pacific Mini Games
| Gold medal – first place | 2017 Port Vila | Heavyweight |

Heimata Neuffer (died 13 November 2020) was a French Polynesian heavyweight boxer who represented French Polynesia at the Pacific Games.

Neuffer was from Raiatea and worked as a police officer. The son of boxer Pascal Neuffer, he began boxing at an early age.

In 2011 he was selected as part of the Tahitian team for the Cadet World Boxing Championships in Astana, Kazakhstan. The following year he was sent to Los Angeles to train.

At the 2015 Pacific Games in Port Moresby he won gold in the heavyweight division. In 2016 he competed in the French Amateur Boxing Championships, losing in the final to Mickael Robert. Following this he was selected to join the Pôle France Boxe at the National Institute of Sport, Expertise, and Performance in Paris.

At the 2017 Pacific Mini Games in Port Vila he had to compete under the banner of the Pacific Games Council due to the disaccreditation of the Polynesian Boxing Federation, but won gold. At the 2019 Pacific Games in Apia he won bronze.

He was killed in a car accident in Raiatea on 13 November 2020. In June 2021 the driver of the vehicle was convicted of manslaughter and sentenced to five years imprisonment.
