= Faʻaasu Loia =

Samoan athlete

Sport
- Country: Samoa
- Sport: Boxing
Medal record
women's Boxing
Representing Samoa
Pacific Games
Gold medal – first place	2019 Apia	Middleweight

Faʻaasu Loia (born ca. 1997) is a Samoan-New Zealand boxer who has represented Samoa at the Pacific Games.

Loia is from Siumu and Lalomanu but moved to New Zealand at the age of six with her family. She was educated at Otahuhu College and the Manukau Institute of Technology, graduating with a Bachelor of Applied Sport and Exercise Science. She took up boxing in 2012, and won the Waikato championships. She then won the Elite Women Under 64 kg title at the New Zealand Boxing Nationals. In 2016 she was selected for the New Zealand women's development squad.

At the 2019 Pacific Games in Apia she won gold in the women's middleweight class. In the leadup to the games she was coached by David Tua.
