= Table tennis at the 2019 Pacific Games =

Table tennis competition

- Venue: Lotopa Harvest Centre
- Location: Apia, Samoa
- Dates: 8–13 July 2019

Table tennis at the 2019 Pacific Games in Apia, Samoa was held on 8–13 July 2019 at the Lotopa Harvest Centre. The sport also included para-athletes.

== Medal summary ==
=== Medal table ===
* Host nation (Samoa)

| Rank | Nation | Gold | Silver | Bronze | Total |
|---|---|---|---|---|---|
| 1 | Vanuatu | 5 | 1 | 0 | 6 |
| 2 | New Caledonia | 2 | 2 | 3 | 7 |
| 2 | Tahiti | 2 | 2 | 3 | 7 |
| 4 | Fiji | 1 | 4 | 3 | 8 |
| 5 | Tuvalu | 1 | 0 | 0 | 1 |
| 6 | Papua New Guinea | 0 | 2 | 0 | 2 |
| 7 | Solomon Islands | 0 | 0 | 1 | 1 |
| Totals (7 entries) | | 11 | 11 | 10 | 32 |

=== Table tennis ===
| Event | Gold | Silver | Bronze | Ref |
|---|---|---|---|---|
| Men's singles | Yoshua Shing; Vanuatu | Kenji Hotan; Tahiti | Ocean Belrose; Tahiti | |
| Women's singles | Priscila Tommy; Vanuatu | Sally Yee; Fiji | Solenn Danger; New Caledonia | |
| Men's doubles | Vanuatu; Ham Lulu; Yoshua Shing | Papua New Guinea; Geoffrey Loi; Gasika Sepa Simoi | Tahiti; Ocean Belrose; Kenji Hotan | |
| Women's doubles | Vanuatu; Anolyn Lulu; Priscila Tommy | Fiji; Sally Yee; Grace Yee | New Caledonia; Fleur Dumortier; Lorie La | |
| Mixed doubles | New Caledonia; Ronan Aubry; Lorie La | Vanuatu; Yoshua Shing; Anolyn Lulu | Fiji; Wang Qi; Sally Yee | |
| Men's team | Tahiti; Ocean Belrose; Kenji Hotan; Yvan Perromat; Matahi Tarano | New Caledonia; Adrien Cerveaux; Laurent Sens; Ronan Aubry; Arthur Mas | Fiji; Vicky Wu; Wang Qi; Philip Wing; Jai Chauhan | |
| Women's team | Vanuatu; Anolyn Lulu; Priscila Tommy; Tracey Mawa; Stephanie Qwea | Fiji; Xuan Li; Sally Yee; Loata Duncan; Grace Yee | New Caledonia; Solenn Danger; Fleur Dumortier; Fabianna Faehau; Lorie La | |

=== Para table tennis ===
| Event | Gold | Silver | Bronze | Ref |
|---|---|---|---|---|
| Men's ambulant | Avelino Monteiro; New Caledonia | Haoda Agari; Papua New Guinea | Allgower Marua'e; Tahiti | |
| Women's ambulant | Heiava Lamaud; Tahiti | Veronique Lussiez; New Caledonia | Noela Olo; Solomon Islands | |
| Men's seated | Ioane Hawaii; Tuvalu | Vincent Tehei; Tahiti | Iakoba Taubakoa; Fiji | |
| Women's seated | Merewalesi Roden; Fiji | Akanisi Latu; Fiji | | |

== See also ==
- Table tennis at the Pacific Games
