= Boxing at the 2019 Pacific Games =

Boxing competition

- Venue: Don Bosco College
- Location: Savaii, Samoa
- Dates: 15–19 July 2019

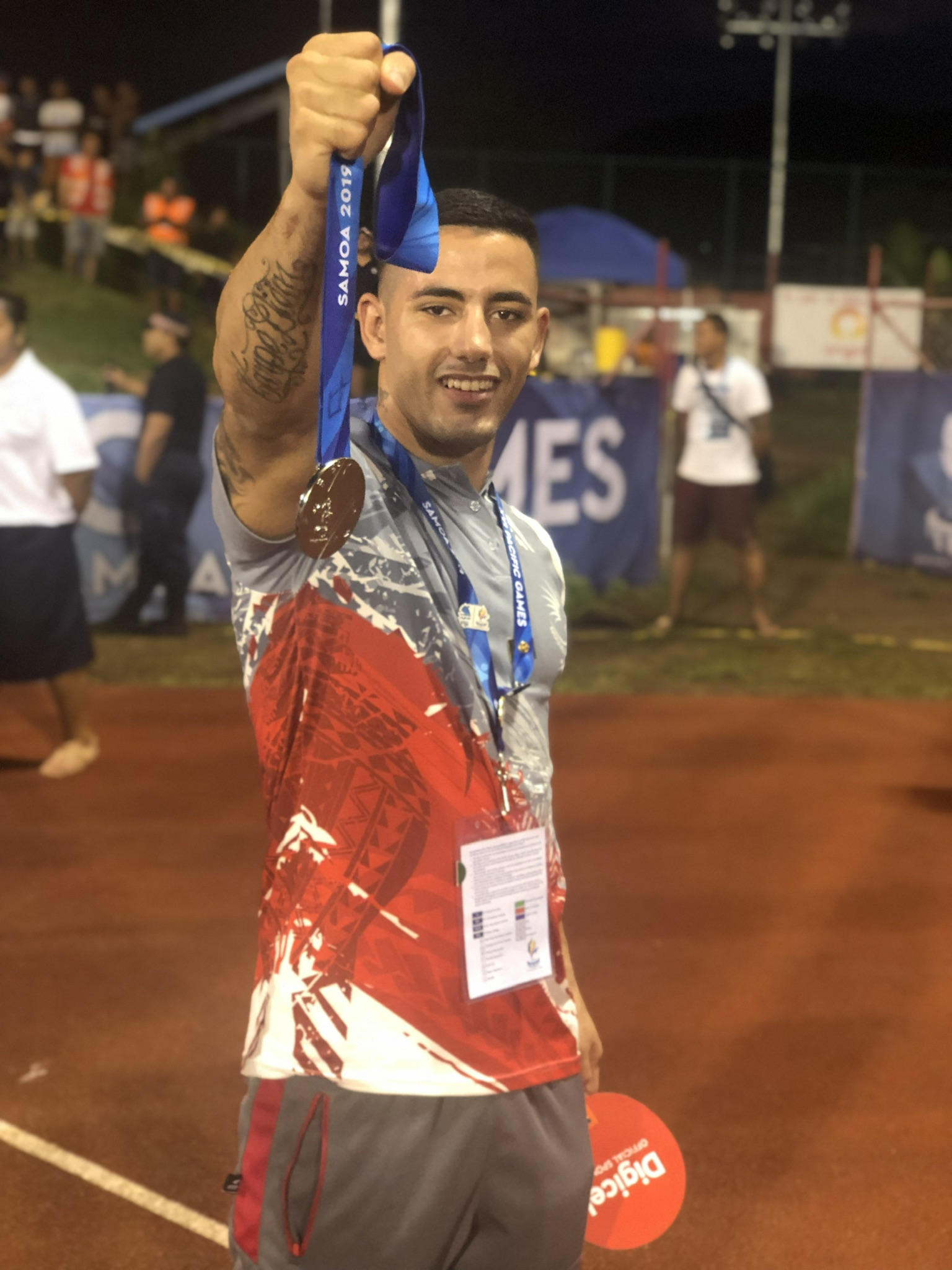
Ramses Thimoumi (New Caledonia) holds aloft the silver medal he won at middleweight in the 2019 Pacific Games.

Boxing at the 2019 Pacific Games was held on 15–19 July 2019 at Don Bosco College in Salelologa on the island of Savaiʻi, Samoa.

== Medal table ==
* Host nation (Samoa)

| Rank | Nation | Gold | Silver | Bronze | Total |
|---|---|---|---|---|---|
| 1 | Samoa* | 7 | 0 | 1 | 8 |
| 2 | Papua New Guinea | 2 | 6 | 1 | 9 |
| 3 | Fiji | 1 | 1 | 1 | 3 |
| 4 | Vanuatu | 1 | 0 | 2 | 3 |
| 5 | Federated States of Micronesia | 1 | 0 | 0 | 1 |
| 5 | Nauru | 1 | 0 | 0 | 1 |
| 7 | New Caledonia | 0 | 2 | 3 | 5 |
| 8 | Tahiti | 0 | 1 | 6 | 7 |
| 9 | Tonga | 0 | 1 | 2 | 3 |
| 10 | American Samoa | 0 | 1 | 1 | 2 |
| 10 | Solomon Islands | 0 | 1 | 1 | 2 |
| 12 | Kiribati | 0 | 0 | 2 | 2 |
| 13 | Niue | 0 | 0 | 1 | 1 |
| 13 | Tuvalu | 0 | 0 | 1 | 1 |
| Totals (14 entries) | | 13 | 13 | 22 | 48 |

== Medalists ==
=== Men ===
| Event | Gold | Silver | Bronze |
|---|---|---|---|
| Light flyweight 46–49 kg | Berri Namri; Vanuatu | Maxie Mangea; Papua New Guinea | not awarded |
| Flyweight; 50–52 kg | Zoheb Ali; Fiji | Charles Keama; Papua New Guinea | Tearii Rua; Tahiti |
| Flyweight; 50–52 kg | Zoheb Ali; Fiji | Charles Keama; Papua New Guinea | Gill Kalai; Vanuatu |
| Bantamweight; 53–56 kg | Christon Amram; Nauru | Jamie Chang; Papua New Guinea | Roger Waoute; Tahiti |
| Bantamweight; 53–56 kg | Christon Amram; Nauru | Jamie Chang; Papua New Guinea | Lanson Ron; Vanuatu |
| Lightweight; 57–60 kg | Nuʻuuli Mose; Samoa | Pemberton Lele; Solomon Islands | Thadius Katua; Papua New Guinea |
| Lightweight; 57–60 kg | Nuʻuuli Mose; Samoa | Pemberton Lele; Solomon Islands | Elia Rokobuli; Fiji |
| Light welterweight 61–64 kg | John Ume; Papua New Guinea | Jone Davule; Fiji | Alai Faʻaula; Samoa |
| Light welterweight 61–64 kg | John Ume; Papua New Guinea | Jone Davule; Fiji | Tevii Steven; Kiribati |
| Welterweight; 65–69 kg | Marion Ah Tong; Samoa | Warren Warupi; Papua New Guinea | Franck Castan; New Caledonia |
| Welterweight; 65–69 kg | Marion Ah Tong; Samoa | Warren Warupi; Papua New Guinea | Toaua Bangke; Kiribati |
| Middleweight; 70–75 kg | Jancen Poutoa; Samoa | Ramses Thimoumi; New Caledonia | Heiarii Mai; Tahiti |
| Middleweight; 70–75 kg | Jancen Poutoa; Samoa | Ramses Thimoumi; New Caledonia | Fiu Tui; Tuvalu |
| Light heavyweight 76–81 kg | Ato Plodzicki-Faoagali; Samoa | Jolando Taala; American Samoa | Tautuarii Nena; Tahiti |
| Light heavyweight 76–81 kg | Ato Plodzicki-Faoagali; Samoa | Jolando Taala; American Samoa | Ken Hurrell; Tonga |
| Heavyweight; 82–91 kg | Afaese Fata Kalepi; Samoa | Arthur Lavalou; Papua New Guinea | Travis Tapatuetoa; Niue |
| Heavyweight; 82–91 kg | Afaese Fata Kalepi; Samoa | Arthur Lavalou; Papua New Guinea | Heimata Neuffer; Tahiti |
| Super heavyweight +91 kg | Filimaua Hala; Samoa | Sepasitiano Hurrell Lavemai; Tonga | Rileyanzac Tuala; American Samoa |
| Super heavyweight +91 kg | Filimaua Hala; Samoa | Sepasitiano Hurrell Lavemai; Tonga | Samson Bade; Solomon Islands |

=== Women ===
| Event | Gold | Silver | Bronze |
|---|---|---|---|
| Flyweight –51 kg | Flora Loga; Papua New Guinea | Mahina Charlot; New Caledonia | not awarded |
| Lightweight –60 kg | Jennifer Chieng; Federated States of Micronesia | Laizani Soma; Papua New Guinea | Edith Tavanae; Tahiti |
| Lightweight –60 kg | Jennifer Chieng; Federated States of Micronesia | Laizani Soma; Papua New Guinea | Fiona Tuilekutu; New Caledonia |
| Middleweight –75 kg | Faʻaasu Loia; Samoa | Heiura Nena; Tahiti | Ismaela Motuku; New Caledonia |
| Middleweight –75 kg | Faʻaasu Loia; Samoa | Heiura Nena; Tahiti | Feʻofaʻaki Epenisa; Tonga |

== See also ==
- Boxing at the Pacific Games
