= Tuvalu at the 2019 Pacific Games =

8 July 2019 – 20 July 2019
- Competitors: 98 in 9 sports
- Medals Ranked 20th: Gold 1 Silver 1 Bronze 1 Total 3

Pacific Games appearances (overview)
- 1979; 1983–1995; 1999; 2003; 2007; 2011; 2015; 2019; 2023

Tuvalu competed at the 2019 Pacific Games in Apia, Samoa. The country participated in nine sports at the 2019 games. The Tuvaluan team was made up of 98 athletes, including 3 para-athletes: Esekai Vaega, Tanielu Soa, and Ioane Hawaii who received a gold medal in the Table Tennis, Men's Seated Singles division.

== Athletics ==
Men

- Kaitu Kaitu - high jump
- Kanaee Saloa Tauia - 100 metres & 200 metres

== Boxing ==
Tuvalu nominated three male boxers to compete in boxing at the 2019 games.

Men

- Alapati A'asa Jr
- Tuinanumea Teaukai
- Fiu Tui

Fiu Tui received a bronze medal, being placed third equal, in the Men's Middle Weight 75 kg event.

== Football ==
=== Men's football ===
8 July 2019 2019 Pacific Games Group Stage	Tuvalu	0–13	Solomon Islands	Apia, Samoa
10:00		Report	Feni 12', 17', 20', 33', 60'; Nawo 24'; Totori 29', 38'; Donga 40'; Kaua 43'; Tanito 44', 73'; Hou 71'	Stadium: J.S. Blatter Stadium; Attendance: 300; Referee: Pari Oito (Tahiti)

10 July 2019 2019 Pacific Games Group Stage	Tuvalu	0–7	Tahiti	Apia, Samoa
9:00		Report	T. Tehau 8', 20' (pen.), 61'; Atani 27'; Tetauira 55'; Barbe 72'; Tehuritaua 82'	Stadium: J.S. Blatter Stadium; Attendance: 150; Referee: Clifford Daypuyat (Philippines)

12 July 2019 2019 Pacific Games Group Stage	American Samoa	1–1	Tuvalu	Apia, Samoa
9:00	Pati 70'	Report		Stadium: J.S. Blatter Stadium; Attendance: 100; Referee: Pari Oito (Tahiti)

15 July 2019 2019 Pacific Games Group Stage	Fiji	10–1	Tuvalu	Apia, Samoa
13:00	Tekiate 10'; Matarerega 15'; Rakula 44'; Wasasala 68', 87'; Vodowaqa 70', 83'; Sami 76'; Krishna 89', 90+2'	Report	Vailine 53'	Stadium: J.S. Blatter Stadium; Attendance: 250; Referee: Nadia Browning (New Zealand)

18 July 2019 2019 Pacific Games Group Stage	New Caledonia	11–0	Tuvalu	Apia, Samoa
10:00	Decoire 2', 33', 90+3'; Saïko 4', 14', 53', 60'; Nokisi 34' (o.g.); Hmaen 67', 85'; Tein-Padom 75'	Report		Stadium: J.S. Blatter Stadium; Referee: Rani Perry (Tahiti)

== Powerlifting ==
Men

- Bernard Ewekia
- Telupe Iosefa
- Kaiau Alefaio
- Nakibae Kitiseni

Telupe Iosefa received a silver medal in the powerlifting 120 kg male division.

== Rugby sevens ==
Tuvalu nominated thirteen male players for their rugby sevens squad to compete at the 2019 games. Elenoa Kunatuba was the Tuvalu men’s 7s coach; she selected seven new players for the games squad.

Men's team

- Petelu Paisi
- Faaiu Paeniu
- Nafa Eitini
- Falegai Feagai
- Iosefa Teuina
- Howard Elisaia
- Sapolu Tetoa
- Toiola Iafeta
- Afesoi Sapakuka
- Jason Silo
- Foufusu Founuku
- Fuivai Vaelei
- James Soketa

== Table tennis ==
Women

- Brenda Christine Katepu
- Betty Resture

Men

Ioane Hawaii received a gold medal in the Table Tennis, Men's Seated Singles division.

== Volleyball ==
=== Beach volleyball ===
Men

- Saaga Malosa and Amalamo Talake.

=== Indoor Volleyball ===
Men

- Sasagi Kaupoe
- Fono Eric Ampelosa
- Reni Atoni
- Iefata Keli
- Ampelosa Luka
- Ata Biira
- Ampex Isaac
- Mitilelei Fiamalua
- Kaitalava Ieti
- Ikapoti Kaisami
- Kilifi Keli
- Tofinga Junior Tofinga
- Esau Teagai
- Viiga Poutoa
- Mafoa Perci Petaia
- Tauati Elisaia
- Taupale Suka
- Teatufalelima File

== Weightlifting ==
Men

- Manuila Raobu
- Tuau Lapua Lapua

Women

- Lyn Niu
