= Boxing at the 2015 Pacific Games =

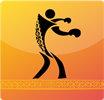
- Boxing pictogram for the Games
- Venue: Caritas Technical Secondary School, Port Moresby
- Dates: 14–18 July

Boxing at the 2015 Pacific Games was held on 14–18 July 2015 at Port Moresby in Papua New Guinea.

== Medal summary ==
=== Medal table ===
* Host nation (Papua New Guinea)

Rank	Nation	Gold	Silver	Bronze	Total
1	Papua New Guinea*	8	1	2	11
2	French Polynesia	2	4	3	9
3	New Caledonia	2	0	1	3
4	Micronesia	1	0	0	1
5	Fiji	0	3	0	3
6	Nauru	0	2	2	4
7	Samoa	0	1	3	4
7	Solomon Islands	0	1	3	4
9	Tonga	0	1	1	2
10	Vanuatu	0	0	3	3
11	Guam	0	0	1	1
11	Kiribati	0	0	1	1
11	Tuvalu	0	0	1	1
Totals (13 entries)		13	13	21	47

=== Men’s results ===
Event	Gold	Silver	Bronze	Refs
Light Flyweight; 46–49 kg	Charles Keama (PNG)	Matauarii Ienfa (TAH)	Paul Kava (SOL); Jean Leonce Nauka (VAN)	
Flyweight; 50–52 kg	Lui Magaiva (PNG)	Teroi Ketner (NRU)	Not Awarded	
Bantamweight; 53–56 kg	Henry Uming (PNG)	Roger Waoute (TAH)	Gardiel Gabuvai (SOL); Boe Warawara (VAN)	
Lightweight; 57–60 kg	Thadius Katua (PNG)	Kaisa Ioane (SAM)	Alphonse Deireragea (NRU); Terauri Taurei (TAH)	
Light-welterweight; 61–64 kg	Tom Boga (PNG)	Colan Caleb (NRU)	Daniel Iata (VAN); Jordan Tuihaa (TAH)	
Welterweight; 65–69 kg	Louis Danglebermes (NCL)	Winston Hill (FIJ)	Andrew Aisaga (PNG); Fifita Pousoo (SAM)	
Middleweight; 70–75 kg	Jonathan Keama (PNG)	Tautuarii Nena (TAH)	Faamanu Aukusol (SAM); Andrew Kometa (KIR)	
Light-heavyweight; 76–81 kg	Luke Hema (NCL)	Tina Ruata (FIJ)	Afaese Kalepi (SAM); Holyfield Riga (SOL)	
Heavyweight; 82–91 kg	Heimata Neuffer (TAH)	Viliame Kalulu (FIJ)	Harry Esela (TUV); Lucas Wakore (PNG)	
Super-heavyweight; 91 kg+	Ariitea Putoa (TAH)	Sepasitiano Hurrell (TON)	Jake Ageidu (NRU); Jean Tuisamoa (NCL)	

=== Women's results ===
Event	Gold	Silver	Bronze	Refs
Flyweight (-51 kg)	Philo Magaiva (PNG)	Rachelle Bonillo (SOL)		
Lightweight (-60 kg)	Jennifer Chieng (FSM)	Raphaela Baki (PNG)	Hatara Ioane (TAH)	
Lightweight (-60 kg)	Jennifer Chieng (FSM)	Raphaela Baki (PNG)	Pueki Fifita (TGA)	
Middleweight (-75 kg)	Debbie Baki Kaore (PNG)	Edith Tavanae (TAH)	Gianna Sarusal (GUM)	

== See also ==
- Boxing at the Pacific Games
