= Powerlifting at the 2015 Pacific Games =

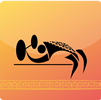
- Powerlifting pictogram for the Games
- Venue: Sir John Guise Indoor Stadium
- Location: Port Moresby
- Dates: 9–10 July 2015

Powerlifting at the 2015 Pacific Games was held from 9–10 July 2015 in the Sir John Guise Indoor Power Dome at Port Moresby, Papua New Guinea. The host nation Papua New Guinea was the dominant team, particularly in the women's divisions where it claimed six of the seven possible gold medals. Nauru was the strongest team in the men's divisions, winning four of the eight weight categories. Telupe Iosefa received the first ever gold medal won by Tuvalu at the Pacific Games in the 120 kg male division.

== Medal summary ==
=== Medal table ===
* Host nation (Papua New Guinea)

Rank	Nation	Gold	Silver	Bronze	Total
1	Papua New Guinea*	8	3	4	15
2	Nauru	4	6	1	11
3	Samoa	2	3	0	5
4	Tuvalu	1	0	2	3
5	Fiji	0	1	1	2
5	French Polynesia	0	1	1	2
7	Kiribati	0	1	0	1
8	New Caledonia	0	0	2	2
Totals (8 entries)		15	15	11	41

=== Men ===
Event	Gold		Silver		Bronze		Refs
−59 kg	Kalau Andrew (PNG)	462.5	Nantei Nikora (KIR)	460.0	Philippe La (NCL)	445.0	
−66 kg	Starron Dowabobo (NRU)	575.0	Henry Kelo (PNG)	530.0	Brown Bolong (PNG)	462.5	
−74 kg	Anderson Mangela (PNG)	628.0	Taggart Duburiya (NRU)	610.0	Kenny Nairne (PNG)	515.0	
−83 kg	Deamo Baguga (NRU)	690.0	Livingstone Sokoli (PNG)	630.0	Frédérick Warsidi (NCL)	600.0	
−93 kg	Ofisa Ofisa (SAM)	715.0	Raboe Roland (NRU)	705.0	Hinau Teotahi (TAH)	565.0	
−105 kg	Roy Detabene (NRU)	725.0	Koale Taala (SAM)	725.0	Alfred Mel (PNG)	650.0	
−120 kg	Telupe Iosefa (TUV)	805.0	Robert Kun (NRU)	777.5	John Tsiode (NRU)	745.0	
+120 kg	Jezza Uepa (NRU)	965.0	Oliva Kirisome (SAM)	947.5	Vagi Henry (PNG)	762.5	

=== Women ===
Event	Gold		Silver		Bronze		Refs
−47 kg	Hitolo Kevau (PNG)	240.0	Navillie Benson (PNG)	235.0	not awarded		
−52 kg	Dobi Mea (PNG)	307.5	Febrose Tsiode (NRU)	302.5	not awarded		
−57 kg	Belinda Umang (PNG)	290.5	Ivy Rose Jones (NRU)	240.0	not awarded		
−63 kg	Melissa Tikio (PNG)	340.0	Sainimere Abariga (FIJ)	285.0	Delia Dabwido (NRU)	242.5	
−72 kg	Linda Pulsan (PNG)	476.0	Eibon Mau (NRU)	462.5	Asenate Manoa (TUV)	340.0	
−84 kg	Meteng Wak (PNG)	398.0	Fila Fuamatu (SAM)	362.5	Teofoga Dabwido (TUV)	332.5	
+84 kg	Matile Sitagata (SAM)	550.5	Alexandrine Fanaura (TAH)	422.5	Elesi Ikanidrodro (FIJ)	422.5	
