= Fila Fuamatu =

Samoan powerlifter

Personal information
- National team: Samoa
- Born: Auckland, New Zealand
- Education: University of Auckland
- Occupation: Teacher

Sport
- Country: Samoa
- Sport: Powerlifting
- Weight class: -84 kg
Medal record
Women's powerlifting
Event	1st	2nd	3rd
Pacific Games	–	2	–
Total	0	2	0
Pacific Games
Silver medal – second place	2011 Nouméa	-84 kg
Silver medal – second place	2015 Port Moresby	-84 kg

Fila Fuamatu is a Samoan powerlifter who has competed at the 2011 and 2015 Pacific Games where she gained a silver medal each time in the women's -84 kg class. Outside of sports, she is a teacher and works to promote healthy living.

== Career ==
Fila Fumamatu trained as a teacher in her native New Zealand, before travelling to Samoa in 2006. Fuamatu ran a sports programme in Samoa for the Australian Sports Commission, which sought to foster a healthy lifestyle in school children, and continued to work as a primary school teacher and community coach. While in Samoa, Fuamatu became involved in sports and went on to play for the Samoa women's national rugby sevens and touch rugby teams. This included playing touch rugby at the 2009 Pacific Mini Games in the Cook Islands.

During the preparation for the 2011 Pacific Games, she sought to be selected for the touch rugby team. When that wasn't included in the programme, she decided to try powerlifting and discovered she had some ability at it. At the Games, Fuamatu placed second in the under-84 kg class and won the silver medal. Following the competition, she suffered an injury while completing a dead lift. She suffered a slipped disc in her spine, and thought that she would not be able to compete at the same level as before. In 2014, she returned to New Zealand from Samoa, and began studying for a degree in public health at the University of Auckland.

She qualified for the Pacific Games once again, for the 2015 Port Moresby competition where she won a silver medal in the under-84 kg category for the second time.
