= Telupe Iosefa =

Tuvaluan powerlifter

Personal information
- Born: 1 November 1986 (age 40) Nukulaelae
Medal record
Men's Powerlifting
Representing Tuvalu
Commonwealth Men's Powerlifting Championships
Silver medal – second place	2013 Commonwealth Men's Powerlifting Championships	105 kg
Pacific Games
Gold medal – first place	2015 Port Moresby	120 kg
Silver medal – second place	2019 Apia	120 kg

Telupe Iosefa (born 1 November 1986, in Nukulaelae) is a Tuvaluan powerlifter. In 2015 Telupe Iosefa received the first ever gold medal won by Tuvalu at the Pacific Games in the powerlifting 120 kg male division.

== Career ==
The Tuvalu Weightlifting Federation staged its first national competition on 2 July 2013 as part of the 2013 Tuvalu Games. Telupe Iosefa won the 105 kg male division.

At the 2013 Commonwealth Men's Powerlifting Championships in Auckland, New Zealand, Iosefa won the silver medal in the 105 kg male division with a total of 647.5 kg.

In 2014 he achieved the best performance in the squat lift with 316 kg in the 120 kg male division at the Oceania Powerlifting Federation event on 14 December 2014 at Melbourne, Australia.

In the powerlifting competition at the 2015 Pacific Games, Telupe Iosefa competed in the 120 kg male division. He achieved a squat lift of 337.5 kg (the best performance), he then produced a bench press of 182.5 kg, followed by a deadlift of 285 kg to achieve the total of 805 kg to win the gold medal in his division. This was an Oceania/Commonwealth Powerlifting Federation record.

At the Asia & Oceania Classic Men's Powerlifting Championships 2016, in Christchurch (New Zealand), in December 2016, Telupe Iosefa competed in the 120 kg male division. He achieved a squat lift of 351.0 kg (the best performance), he then produced a bench press of 190.0 kg, followed by a deadlift of 310.0 kg to achieve the total of 851.0 kg to win the gold medal in his division.

Telupe Iosefa competed in the 120 kg division at the 2017 Asia & Oceania Championships held in Singapore and the 2018 Asia & Oceania Championships held in Brisbane, Australia.

Telupe Iosefa received a silver medal in the powerlifting 120 kg male division at the 2019 Pacific Games held in Apia, Samoa.

== Achievements ==
Powerlifting

Event	Performance	Date	Place
Commonwealth Men's Powerlifting Championships	105 kg male division - silver medal - total of 647.5 kg	8 December 2013	Auckland, New Zealand
Oceania Powerlifting Championships	120 kg male division - squat lift of 316 kg	14 December 2014	Melbourne, Australia
2015 Pacific Games	120 kg male division - gold medal - total of 805 kg	10 July 2015	Port Moresby, Papua New Guinea
2019 Pacific Games	120 kg male division - silver medal	20 July 2019	Apia, Samoa
