= Basketball in Tuvalu =

The lack of facilities holds back the development of basketball in Tuvalu. The people of Funafuti use the asphalt runway of Funafuti International Airport as a basketball court, although use of the court is restricted by the hot sun and rain. The early morning and the late afternoon provide opportunities to play recreational games.

There are men's tournaments held throughout the year but there are no organised competitions for women and children. The goal of the Tuvalu Basketball Federation is to develop participation in the sport by children and the adult men and women and get the national teams back into regional competitions.

Ampelosa Tehulu is the President for the Tuvalu Basketball Federation and Charles Leepo is the Vice President. Annie La Fleur, the International Basketball Federation Oceania Development Manager was on Funafuti in February 2015 to help kick start what used to be one of the popular sports.
