= Tuvalu at the 2015 Pacific Games =

- IOC code: TUV

4 July 2015 – 18 July 2015
- Competitors: 101 in 10 sports
- Medals Ranked 19th: Gold 1 Silver 0 Bronze 3 Total 4

Pacific Games appearances (overview)
- 1979; 1983–1995; 1999; 2003; 2007; 2011; 2015; 2019; 2023

Tuvalu competed at the 2015 Pacific Games in Port Moresby, Papua New Guinea from 4 to 18 July 2015. Nakibae Kitisane was the Chef de Mission. Tuvalu listed 101 competitors as of 4 July 2015. Four competitors qualified for two sports. (Note: Togafiti Eliko, Ela Lupeni and Tuau Lapua Lapua qualified in powerlifting and weightlifting. Etimoni Timuani qualified in athletics and touch rugby.)

Tuvalu was ranked 19th at the Games, with 4 medals (1 gold - 0 silver - 3 bronze). Telupe Iosefa received the first ever gold medal won by Tuvalu at the Pacific Games in the powerlifting 120 kg male division.

== Athletics ==
Tuvalu qualified 7 athletes in track and field:

Women

- Telesita Tusitala (Discus - best throw 25.81 metres - placed 6th)

Men

- Pouesi Kofe (Javelin - best throw 44.96 metres - placed 9th)
- Etimoni Timuani (100 metres - disqualified after false start in heat)
- Vaiuli Nukualofa
- Mafoa Perci Petaia
- Telito Filoimea Telito

=== Parasport ===
Men

- Iosefatu Joe Utime

== Beach volleyball ==
Tuvalu qualified 4 athletes in beach volleyball. The women played in Pool A of the competition and lost all the games in the preliminary rounds. The men played in Pool A of the competition and lost all the games in the preliminary rounds.

Women

- Terokoraoi Ipitoa
- Taliu Tuimanuga

Men

- Tinifa Papamau
- Jackson Vailine

== Boxing ==
Tuvalu qualified 5 athletes in boxing:

Men

- Harry Dave Eti Esela (Heavy-weight 82–91 kg Male - bronze medal)
- Javin Kamtaura (Middle-weight 70–75 kg Male)
- Tapaeko Elisaia
- Patala Fagalele
- Maola Itiniua

== Powerlifting ==
the Tuvalu Powerlifting Federation qualified 15 athletes in powerlifting:

Women

- Asenate Manoa (72 kg Female - TOTAL 340 kg - bronze medal)
- Ela Lupeni (72 kg Female - TOTAL 310 kg - PLACED 4th)
- Teofoga Edueni Sonya Dabwido (84 kg Female - TOTAL 332.5 kg - bronze medal)
- Susie Tulimanu (84 kg+ Female - TOTAL 375 kg - PLACED 5th)
- Togafiti Eliko (84 kg+ Female - TOTAL 285 kg - PLACED 6th)

Men

- John Sauola Felemeni (74 kg Male - TOTAL 445 kg - PLACED 5th)
- Nakibae Kitiseni (74 kg Male - third best bench-press and dead-lift but failed to complete the squat, meaning his final total was zero)
- Bernard Ewekia (83 kg Male - TOTAL 467.5 kg - PLACED 8th)
- Ita Uniuni (83 kg Male - TOTAL 420 kg - PLACED 10th)
- Mark Loleni (93 kg Male - TOTAL 510 kg - PLACED 4th)
- Fakataliga Ulisese (93 kg Male - TOTAL 490 kg - PLACED 5th)
- Telupe Iosefa won the gold medal in the 120 kg male division, with a squat lift of 337.5 kg (the best performance), he then produced a bench press of 182.5 kg, followed by a deadlift of 285 kg to achieve the total of 805 kg.
- Tuau Lapua Lapua (59 kg Male - TOTAL 440 kg - PLACED 4th)
- John Taani Anisani

== Table tennis ==
Tuvalu qualified 11 athletes in table tennis. The women played in the team event but did not progress beyond the round-robin matches. The men played in the team event but did not progress beyond the round-robin matches.

- Brenda Christine Katepu
- Betty Resture
- Kaimalie Resture
- Alex Fred Resture
- Kalton Melton
- Tesika Peti
- Tulimanu Vaea
- Fakanaaga Manase
- Seluka Resture
- Sulami Resture
- Hililogo Toai

== Taekwondo ==
Tuvalu qualified 2 athletes in taekwondo:

Men

- Faulufalenga Epu
- Sioota Makolo Pole

== Tennis ==
Tuvalu qualified 4 athletes in tennis. They played in the team event but did not progress beyond the round-robin matches.

Men

- Saintly Alesi Moloti
- Felo Nai
- Tepanini Pita
- Isopo Sokomani

== Touch rugby ==
Tuvalu qualified a men's team in touch rugby (16 players). The Tuvalu team won against Tonga 6-5 (touchdowns) in the first game; they were defeated by Cook Islands 11-3 in the second game; they won against Kiribati 11-2 in the third game; and in the final game of the round robin competition, Tuvalu was defeated by Solomon Islands 10-4. The team did not proceed to the semi-finals and ended up in 6th place in the competition.:

Men

- Nafa Eitini
- Iese Falaile
- Christopher Fatulolo
- Falegai Feagai
- Lasalo Kolokai
- Laijia Kuruisalili
- Tausau Lopati
- Tata Lousi
- Julian Niu
- Petelu Paisi
- Meauma Petaia
- Manatu Siose
- Elia Tavita
- Etimoni Timuani
- Lutelu Tanelua Tiute
- Tiaoti Maatia Toafa Toafa

== Volleyball ==
Tuvalu qualified men's and women's teams in volleyball (28 players). The women played in Pool A of the competition and lost all the games in the preliminary rounds. The men played in Pool B of the competition and won the game against Nauru (3-2) but lost against Fiji, New Caledonia, American Samoa, Wallis and Futuna.

- Sally Atalulu Faleasiu
- Lilly Lafita
- Lillyvanu Maketi
- Masetapu Freda Junior Resture
- Lillian Tusitala
- Thomas Pati
- Tauati Elisaia
- Loluama Eti
- Matagimalie Evagelia
- Imo Fiamalua
- Eleni Ioapo
- Ikapoti Kaisami
- Foma Kalala
- Iefata Keli
- Afemai Lopati
- Valoa Lutelu
- Saili Melo
- Vaiaho Napoe
- Taulau Niusala
- Logovale Pola
- Nove Poloie
- Viiga Poutoa
- Valisi Sakalia
- Akinesi Sio
- Vili Tetoa
- Jay Timo
- Nisha Tusitala
- Sagalei Uila

== Weightlifting ==
The Tuvalu Weightlifting Federation qualified 13 athletes in weightlifting. The Senior, Youth & Junior Oceania Weightlifting Championships 2015 were held same time as the Pacific Games weightlifting competition:

Women

- Lepeka Felieisi (Snatch 63 kg Female - best 50 kg - placed 7th equal) Participated in the Senior Oceania Weightlifting Championship 2015. Participated in the Junior Oceania Weightlifting Championship 2015. Participated in the Youth Oceania Weightlifting Championship 2015.
- Tigerina Joglina Telogo (Snatch 63 kg Female - best 50 kg - placed 7th equal) Participated in the Senior Oceania Weightlifting Championship 2015. Participated in Junior Oceania Weightlifting Championship 2015.
- Alieta Adrianne Kalakaua (Snatch 69 kg Female - best 50 kg - placed 6th) (Clean and Jerk 69 kg Female - best 65 kg - placed 6th) (TOTAL 115 kg - PLACED 9th) Participated in the Senior Oceania Weightlifting Championship 2015. Participated in the Junior Oceania Weightlifting Championship 2015. Participated in the Youth Oceania Weightlifting Championship 2015.
- Togafiti Eliko (75+kg Female - no successful lifts) Participated in the Senior Oceania Weightlifting Championship 2015. Participated in the Junior Oceania Weightlifting Championship 2015. Participated in the Youth Oceania Weightlifting Championship 2015.
- Ela Lupeni

Men

- Manuila Raobu - Participated in the Senior Oceania Weightlifting Championship 2015. Participated in the Junior Oceania Weightlifting Championship 2015 (Snatch 56 kg Male - best 65 kg - placed 5th) (Clean and Jerk 56 kg Male - best 77 kg - placed 6th) (TOTAL 142 kg - PLACED 6th) Participated in the Youth Oceania Weightlifting Championship 2015.
- Munua Tuau Lapua (Snatch 62 kg Male - best 75 kg - placed 5th) (Clean and Jerk 62 kg Male - best 106 kg - placed 4th) (TOTAL 181 kg - PLACED 4th) Participated in the Senior Oceania Weightlifting Championship 2015. He won the silver medal in his category in the Junior Oceania Weightlifting Championship 2015.
- Logona Esau (Clean and Jerk 77 kg Male - best 145 kg - placed 4th) Participated in the Senior Oceania Weightlifting Championship 2015.
- Tavevele Noa (Snatch 77 kg Male - best 95 kg - placed 10th) (Clean and Jerk 77 kg Male - best 125 kg - placed 9th) (TOTAL 22O kg - PLACED 10th) Participated in the Senior Oceania Weightlifting Championship 2015.
- Tafaoata Tuau Lapua (Snatch 85 kg Male - best 100 kg - placed 8th equal) (Clean and Jerk 85 kg Male- best 128 kg - placed 11th) (TOTAL 228 kg - PLACED 11th) Participated in the Senior Oceania Weightlifting Championship 2015. He won the silver medal in his category in the Junior Oceania Weightlifting Championship 2015.
- Lale Esau (disqualified on first day of weightlifting for being over weight in his category).
- Tuau Lapua Lapua (disqualified on first day of weightlifting for being over weight in his category).
- Teiloa Lotomahana (disqualified on first day of weightlifting for being under weight in his category).
- Isaia Takuya Nuese Temaka
- Vili Eliko
