= Jezza Uepa =

Nauruan powerlifter

Personal information
- Born: 1980 (age 45–46)

Sport
- Sport: Powerlifting
Medal record
Representing Nauru
Classic Men's World Championships
Gold medal – first place	2019 Helsingborg	120+ kg
Silver medal – second place	2016 Killeen	120+ kg
Silver medal – second place	2017 Minsk	120+ kg
Bronze medal – third place	2013 Suzdal	120+ kg
Pacific Games
Bronze medal – third place	2011 Noumea	120+ kg

Jezza Uepa (born 1980) is a Nauruan powerlifter. Uepa has won gold medal at the 2019 World Classic Powerlifting Championships in 120+ category. In his collection from world championships, he has got also two silver and one bronze medal. He also won a bronze medal at the 2011 Pacific Games. Following the 2019 World Powerlifting Championship in Sweden, Uepa was crowned as the World's Strongest Man. In 2017, Uepa has squatted 470 kg at Brisbane Open.

== Personal life ==
His daughter, Maximina Uepa, is successful weightlifter. Her biggest success is bronze medal at the 2022 Commonwealth Games in 76 kg category.
