= Tuvalu Games =

The Tuvalu Games is a multi-sport event, much like the Pacific Games (although on a much smaller scale), with participation exclusively from islands around Tuvalu.

== History ==
The Games began in 2008, hosted in the capital, Funafuti.

All 8 islands can participate and compete between each island in events such as track and field events, football, badminton and other games.

In 2011 the Tuvalu Games were held in Funafuti from April 26 to April 30. Nukufetau won the most medals.

== Competing Islands ==
- Funafuti
- Vaitupu
- Nukufetau
- Nukulaelae
- Nanumea
- Niutao
- Nanumanga
- Nui

== Sports ==
- Association football
- Athletics
- Badminton
- Canoeing
- Rugby Sevens
- Tennis
- Volleyball

== Football at the Tuvalu Games ==
Tuvalu Games
- Founded: 2008
- Teams: 8
- Current champions: FC Tofaga (3 titles)
- Most championships: FC Manu Laeva and FC Tofaga (3 titles)
- Men's tournament Women's tournament

Football has been a regular event at the Tuvalu Games, and is a competition organized by the Tuvalu National Football Association. It is also called the Tuvalu Cup.

=== History ===
The tournament began in the 2008 season. The first champions were FC Manu Laeva.

The 2013 champions were FC Tofaga; winning the final against Nauti 1–0, with Etimoni Timuani scoring the only goal.

=== Men's tournament ===
==== Results ====
Year	Winner	Runner-up	Score
2008	FC Manu Laeva	Lakena United	1–0
2009	FC Manu Laeva	FC Tofaga	3–1
2010	FC Tofaga	Nauti FC	2–1
2011	FC Manu Laeva	FC Tofaga	3–1
2012	FC Tofaga	Tamanuku	2–1
2013	FC Tofaga	Nauti FC	1–0
2014	FC Manu Laeva	Ha'apai United	2–0
2015	Not held		
2016 (Mini Games)	FC Manu Laeva	FC Tofaga	3-1
2017	FC Manu Laeva	Nauti FC	1-0
2018-2020	Not held		

==== Number of Pacific Games titles ====
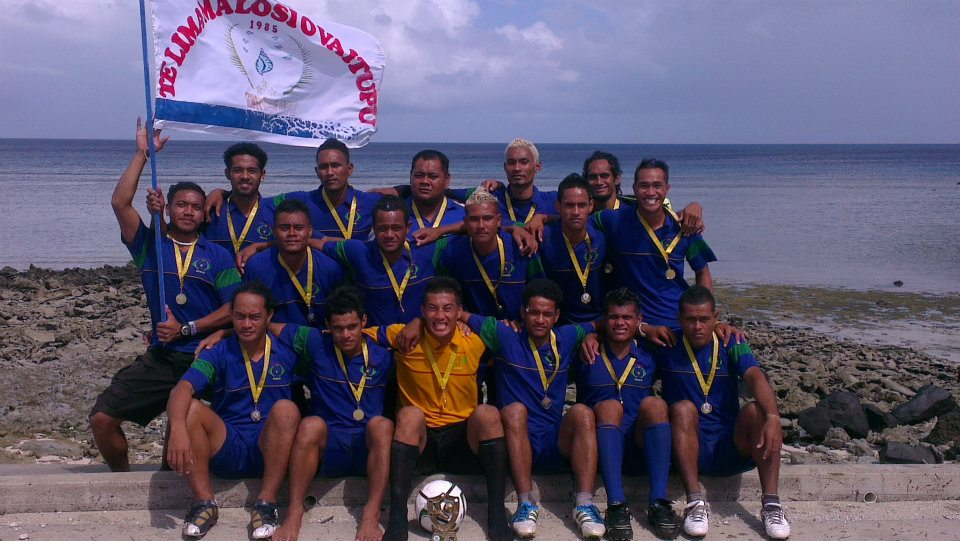
Tofaga A winners Tuvalu Games 2012

Pos.	Club	# Wins	Winning years
1	FC Manu Laeva	5	2008, 2009, 2011, 2014, 2017
2	FC Tofaga	3	2010, 2012, 2013

=== Women's tournament ===
==== Results ====
Year	Winner	Runner-up	Score
2010	Tamanuku	Tofaga	1–0
2011	Tamanuku	Tofaga	1–0
2012	Tamanuku	Nauti	1–1 (3–1)
2013	Nauti	Nui	0–0 (3–2)
2014	Nui	Niutao	1–0

==== Number of titles ====
Pos.	Club	# Wins	Winning years
1	Tamanuku	3	2010, 2011, 2012
2	Nauti	1	2013
2	Nui	1	2014

=== Men's B teams tournament ===
==== Results ====
Year	Winner	Runner-up	Score
2012	Lakena United B	Manu Laeva B	2–0
2013	Tofaga B	Lakena United B	1–0
2014	Nauti B	Tofaga B	1–0

==== Number of titles: B teams ====
	Club	# Wins	Winning tears
1	Lakena United B	1	2012
1	Tofaga B	1	2013
1	Nauti B	1	2014
