= Logona Esau =

Tuvaluan weightlifter

Personal information
- Born: 2 March 1987 (age 39) Nukufetau
- Height: 1.63 m (5 ft 4 in)
- Weight: 69 kg (152 lb)

Sport
- Country: Tuvalu
- Sport: Weightlifting
Medal record
South Pacific Games
Bronze medal – third place	2005 South Pacific Mini Games	62 kg combined event
Silver medal – second place	2007 Pacific Games	69 kg CJ

Logona Esau (born 2 March 1987 on Nukufetau) is a Tuvaluan weightlifter.

== Biography ==
He was the first athlete from Tuvalu to win a medal at an international competition, when he took bronze in the 62 kg combined event at the 2005 South Pacific Mini Games in Koror, Palau. As of 2006, he was ranked 132nd in the world by the International Weightlifting Federation.

In 2007, he won silver in the men's 69 kg clean and jerk at the Pacific Games in Apia, lifting 141 kg. In August 2008, he took part in the World Weightlifting Championships.

Esau represented Tuvalu at the 2006 Commonwealth Games in Melbourne and also represented Tuvalu at the 2008 Summer Olympics. The 2008 Summer Olympics in Beijing was the first Olympic Games, in which Tuvalu participated. Esau finished 23rd in his event. Esau was Tuvalu's flagbearer during the Games' opening ceremony.
