= Tuau Lapua Lapua =

Tuvaluan weightlifter

Personal information
- Nationality: Tuvalu
- Born: April 15, 1991 (age 35) Nanumaga, Tuvalu
- Height: 140 cm (4 ft 7 in)
- Weight: 62 kg (137 lb)

Sport
- Sport: Weightlifting
- Event: -62 kg
Medal record
Men's Weightlifting
Representing Tuvalu
Pacific Games
Silver medal – second place	2011 Nouméa	-62 kg

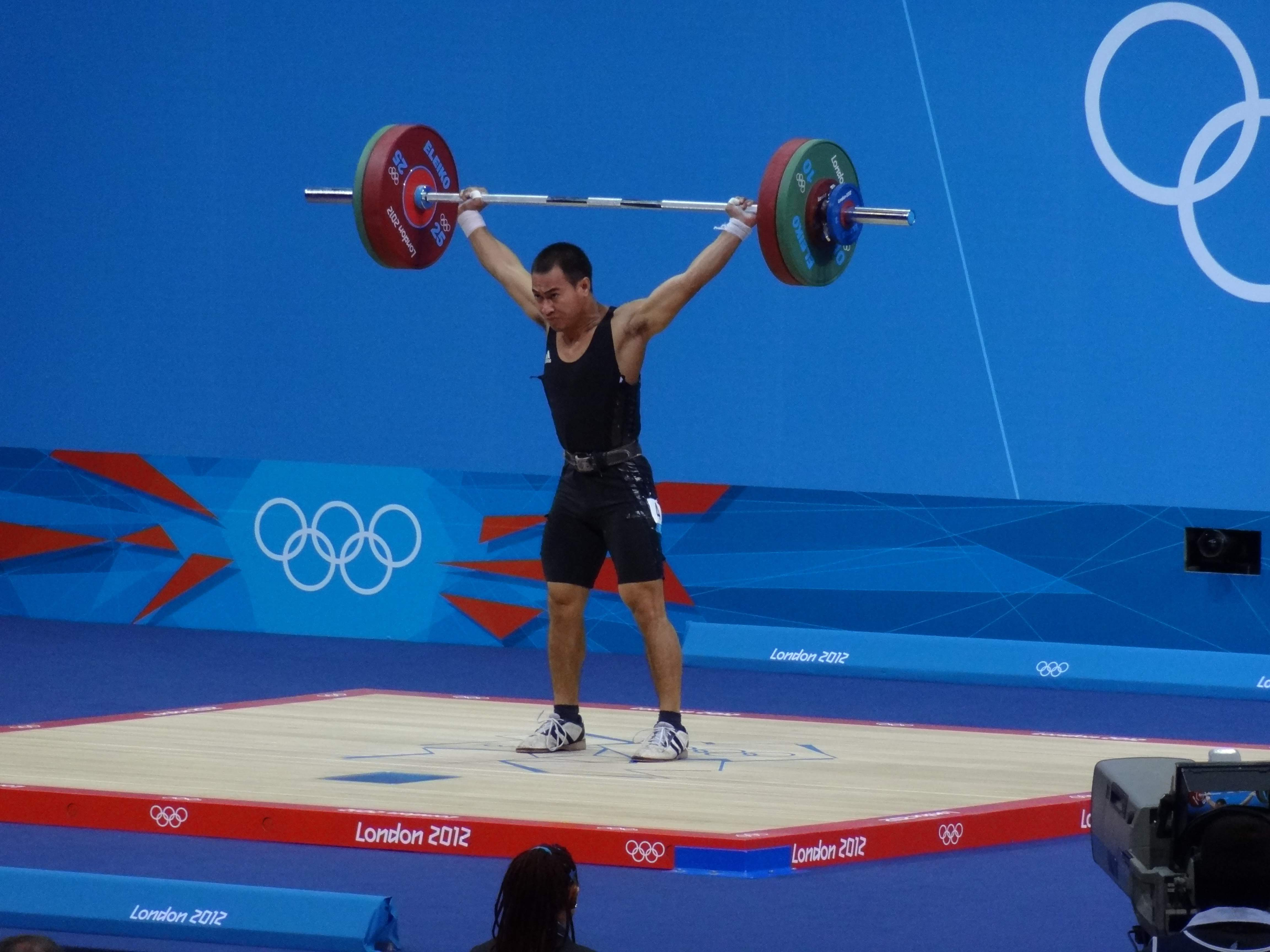
Lapua competing at the 2012 Summer Olympics in London

Tuau Lapua Lapua (born 15 April 1991 in Nanumaga) is a Tuvaluan weightlifter.

At the 2010 Commonwealth Games in Delhi, India, he finished in 15th position in the men’s final for weightlifting (62 kg), with a lift of 220 kg.

In Weightlifting at the 2011 Pacific Games he won: -62 kg Clean & Jerk, -62 kg Snatch, -62 kg Total.

He competed at the 2012 Summer Olympics in the Men's 62 kg where he finished with a rank of 12.

At the 2013 Pacific Mini Games, he made history by winning his country’s first ever gold medal in major sporting competition, when he won the 62 kg snatch. He also won 62 kg clean and jerk, and 62 kg combined event.

At the 2014 Commonwealth Games, he did not finish his event, failing to record a lift in the snatch.
