= Timeline of the history of Tuvalu =

The Flag of Tuvalu

The Coat of arms of Tuvalu

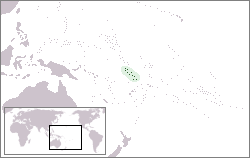
The location of Tuvalu

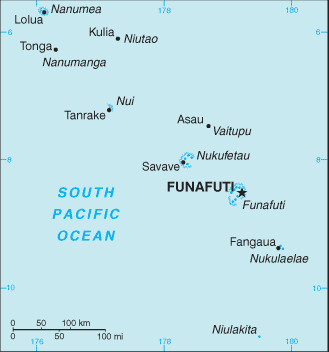
An enlargeable map of Tuvalu

Tuvalu is an archipelago in Polynesia consisting of three reef islands and six atolls spread out between the latitude of 5° and 10° south and between the longitude of 176° and 180°. The Austronesian peoples began to settle Southeast Asia and Oceania in around 3000 BCE, and had reached western Polynesia (including Tuvalu) by around 900 BCE.

== Oral history ==
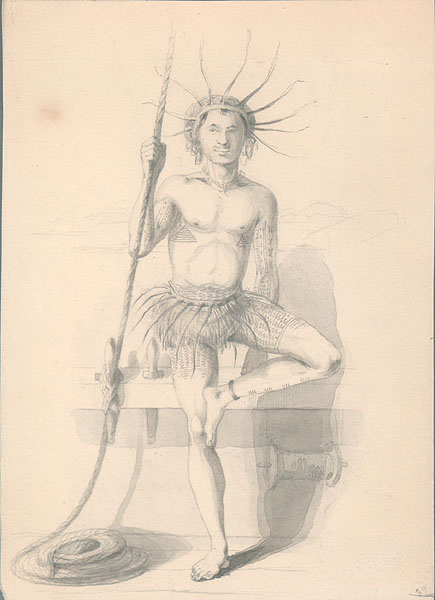
Tuvaluan man in traditional costume drawn by Alfred Agate in 1841 during the United States Exploring Expedition.

Date	Event
1101 to 1300 AD	The traditions of the people of Niutao, Funafuti and Vaitupu are that their founding ancestors came from Samoa in the 12th or 13th century. The Tu'i Manu'a Confederacy, ruled by the holders of the Tu'i Manu'a title, is understood to have included much of Western Polynesia and some Polynesian outliers.
1201 to 1500 AD	The traditions of the people of Nanumea is that their founding ancestors came from Tonga. The Tuʻi Tonga Empire ruled by the Tuʻi Tonga line of Tongan kings was at its height during this period.
1401 to 1600 AD	The oral history of Niutao recalls two invasions of Tongan warriors in the 15th century, when the Tongans were repelled. A third and fourth invasion of Tongans occurred in the late 16th century, again with the Tongans being defeated.
1601-1700 AD	The oral history of Niutao recalls two invasions of warriors from the islands of Kiribati who were defeated in battles fought on the reef.

== 1568 to 1900 ==
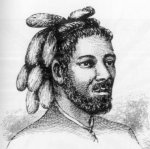
A man from Nukufetau atoll, 1841.

Date	Event
16 January 1568	Álvaro de Mendaña de Neira from Spain sighted the island of Nui, and charted it as Isla de Jesús ("Island of Jesus").
29 August 1595	During Mendaña's second voyage across the Pacific he passed Niulakita, which island he named La Solitaria.
1764	Captain John Byron passed through the islands of Tuvalu during his circumnavigation of the globe as captain of HMS Dolphin.
5 May 1781	Francisco Mourelle de la Rúa sailed past Niutao.
May 1819	Arent Schuyler de Peyster, captain of the Rebecca, sighted Nukufetau and Funafuti, which he named Ellice's Island after an English Politician, Edward Ellice, the Member of Parliament for Coventry and the owner of the Rebecca's cargo. The name Ellice Islands was subsequently used for all the islands.
1820	The Russian explorer Mikhail Lazarev visited Nukufetau as commander of the Mirny.
May 1824	Louis Isidore Duperrey, captain of La Coquille, sailed past Nanumanga.
14 May 1825	A Dutch expedition (the frigate Maria Reigersberg) found Nui atoll and named the main island (Fenua Tapu) as Nederlandsch Eiland.
1841	The United States Exploring Expedition under Charles Wilkes visited Funafuti, Nukufetau and Vaitupu.
1850s	John (also known as Jack) O'Brien was the first European to settle in the islands, he became a trader on Funafuti. He married Salai, the daughter of the paramount chief of Funafuti.
1861	Elekana, a Christian deacon from Manihiki in the Cook Islands became caught in a storm in a canoe and drifted for 8 weeks before landing at Nukulaelae and began proselytising the Christian faith.
1863	"Blackbirders" enticed about 180 people from Funafuti and about 200 from Nukulaelae on board ships for transport to work to mine the guano deposits on the Chincha Islands in Peru – they never returned to the islands.
1865	The Rev. Archibald Wright Murray of the London Missionary Society arrived in the islands as the first European missionary. The work of this Protestant congregationalist missionary society resulted in the Congregational Christian Church of Tuvalu (Te Ekalesia Kelisiano Tuvalu).
16 February 1882	A tsunami struck Nui.
1883	A tropical cyclone struck Funafuti destroying all buildings.
1890	Robert Louis Stevenson, his wife Fanny Vandegrift Stevenson, and her son Lloyd Osbourne visited the islands on the trading steamship the Janet Nicoll.
1891	A tropical cyclone struck the islands.
Between 9 and 16 October 1892	Each of the Ellice Islands was declared a British protectorate by Captain Herbert Gibson of HMS Curacao. The Ellice Islands were subsequently placed under the jurisdiction of the Fiji-based Western Pacific High Commission, with authority delegate to a resident commissioner based in the Gilbert Islands.
1894	A tropical cyclone struck the islands.
1896	The Royal Society of London conducts the first of three expeditions to Funafuti to drill into the island for the purpose of investigating the formation of coral reefs. This investigation followed the work on the structure and distribution of coral reefs conducted by Charles Darwin in the Pacific.

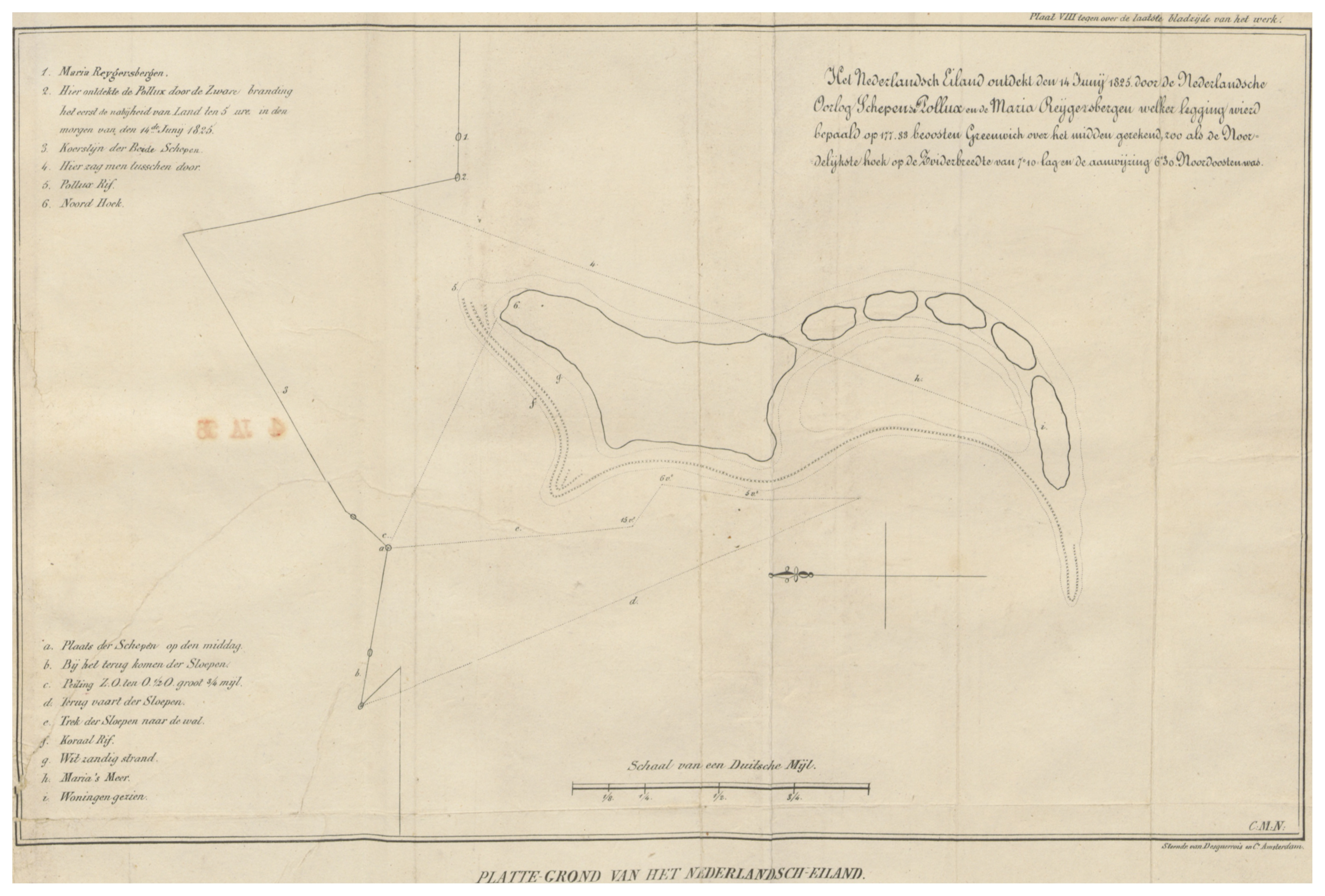
Dutch map of Nui atoll, made in June 1825

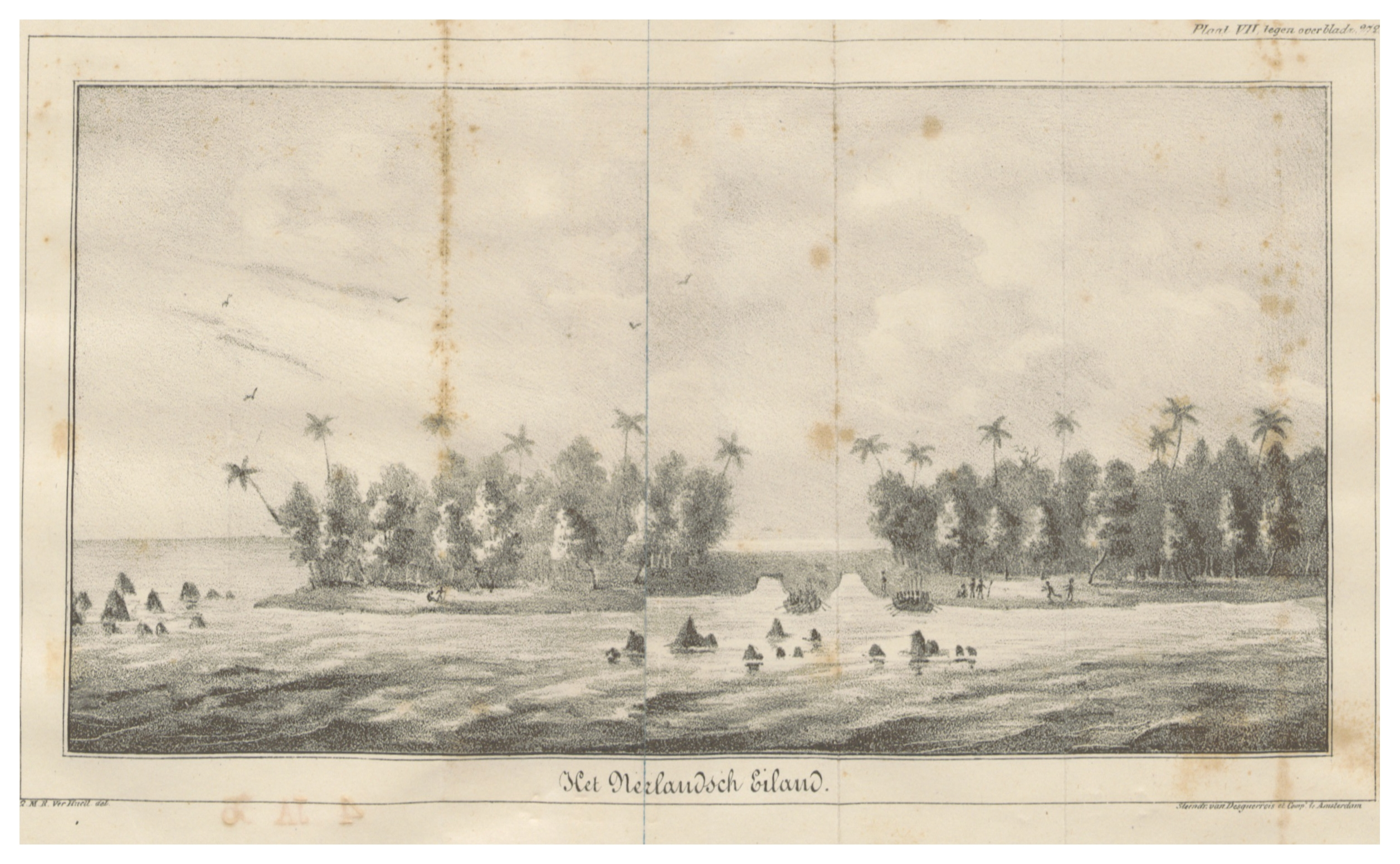
View of Fenua Tapu, Nui atoll

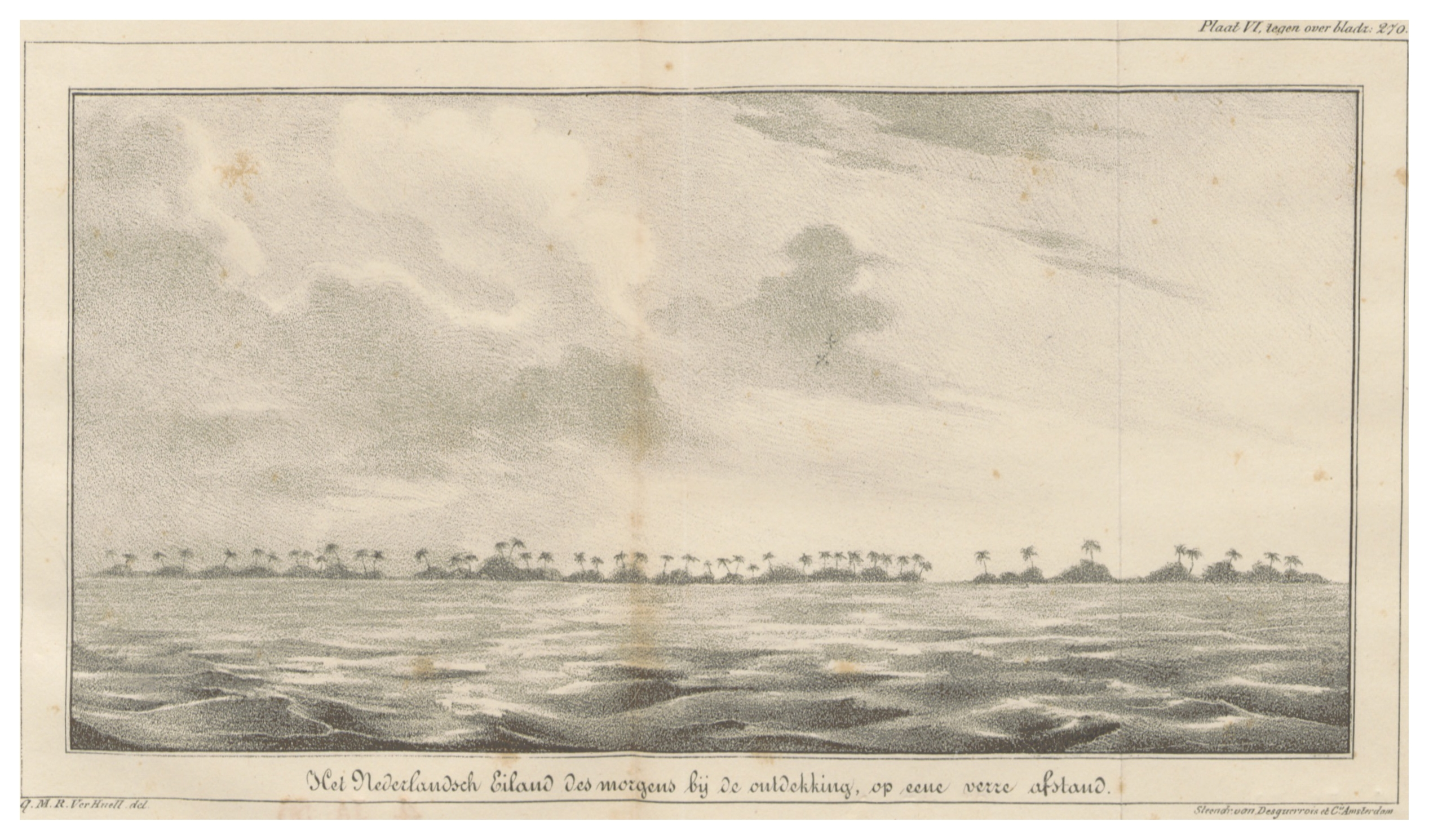
View of Nui atoll

== 1901 to 1976 ==
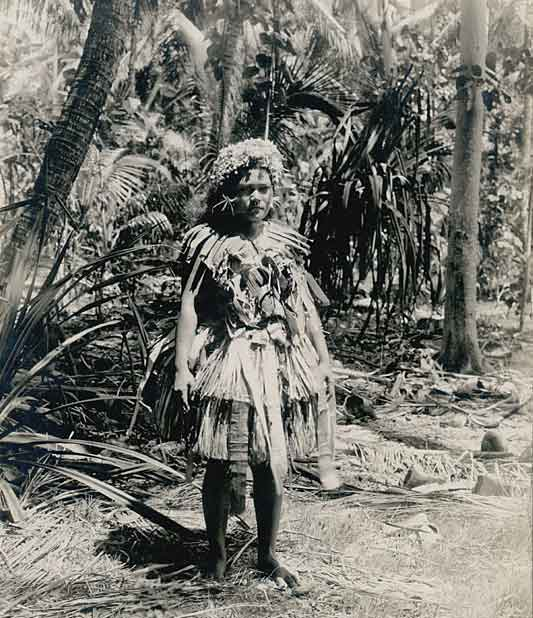
Woman on Funafuti, Harry Clifford Fassett (1900).

Date	Event
1905	The London Missionary Society (LMS) established a primary school at Motufoua on Vaitupu. This school evolved into the Motufoua Secondary School.
1913	The hospital was established at Funafuti.
1916	The Gilbert and Ellice Islands Colony (GEIC) was established.
2 October 1942	United States Marine Corps landed on Funafuti. Naval Construction Battalion (Seabees) built Funafuti Airfield, Nanumea Airfield and Nukufetau Airfield. During the Pacific War the American bases acted as a staging post during the preparation for the Battle of Tarawa and the Battle of Makin that commenced on 20 November 1943.
1947	Tarawa, in the Gilbert Islands, was made the administrative capital of the Gilbert and Ellice Islands Colony. This development included establishing the King George V Secondary School for boys and the Elaine Bernacchi Secondary School for girls.
1956	A Colony Conference was organised at Marakei, which was attended by officials and representatives from each island in the Gilbert and Ellice Islands Colony, conferences were held every 2 years until 1962.
1964	An Executive Council was established to advise the Resident Commissioner.
1965	Island councils were established with the islanders electing the councillors who then choose the president of the council. The executive officer of each local council was appointed by the central government.
1967	A Constitution was introduced, which created a House of Representatives for the Gilbert and Ellice Islands Colony that comprised 7 appointed officials and 23 members elected by the islanders. The Ellice Islands elected 4 members of the House of Representatives. The 1967 Constitution also established the Governing Council.
1971	A new Constitution was introduced in 1971, which provided that each of the Ellice Islands (except Niulakita) elected one representative to the House of Representatives.
21 & 22 October 1972	Funafuti was severely damaged by Cyclone Bebe.
1974	Ministerial government was introduced to the Gilbert and Ellice Islands Colony through a change to the Constitution.
December 1974	A self-determination referendum was held to determine whether the Gilbert Islands and Ellice Islands should each have their own administration.
1975	Students that attended schools on Tawara were transferred to Motufoua Secondary School.
1975	Princess Margaret Hospital was completed with the financing provided by New Zealand.
1 October 1975	The Tuvaluan Order 1975, made by the Privy Council, took effect with Tuvalu recognised as a separate British dependency with its own government.
1 January 1976	The civil service of the Gilbert and Ellice Islands was separated, to form the administrative offices of the separate British colonies of Kiribati and Tuvalu.

== 1977 to 2000 ==
Date	Event
1 October 1978	Tuvalu became fully independent within the Commonwealth. 1 October is celebrated as Tuvalu Independence Day.
1978	Tuvalu for the Almighty (Tuvalu mo te Atua) was adopted as the national anthem of Tuvalu. The lyrics and music were composed by Afaese Manoa.
1978	The Tuvalu Maritime Training Institute was established to train Tuvaluan men for employment on merchant shipping.
1979	The Tuvalu national football team played international matches in the 1979 South Pacific Games, held in Fiji.
1986	The Constitution of Tuvalu that was adopted upon independence was revised so that it addressed Tuvaluan customs and traditions as well as the aspirations and values of the Tuvaluan people.
30 January and 1 February 1990	Cyclone Ofa had a major impact on Vaitupu with around 85 percent of residential homes, trees and food crops being destroyed.
3 to 14 June 1992	Tuvalu participated in the Earth Summit, United Nations Conference on Environment and Development (UNCED), also known as the Rio Summit or Rio Conference, held in Rio de Janeiro.
October 1994	Pacific-class patrol boat (HMTSS Te Mataili) provided to Tuvalu by Australia under the Pacific Patrol Boat Program for use in maritime surveillance and fishery patrol and for search-and-rescue missions.
January 1996	The Flag of Tuvalu was changed to remove the Union Jack, from the upper left canton of the flag, however the Flag of Tuvalu reverted to the previous design in April 1997.
1998	Tuvalu first participated in the Commonwealth Games when a weightlifter attended the games held in Kuala Lumpur.
1999	The Funafuti Conservation Area was created for the conservation of the marine and land based biodiversity (plants, animals and ecosystems) within the protected area.
17 September 2000	Tuvalu became the 189th member of the United Nations.

Flag of the Gilbert and Ellice Islands, of which Tuvalu was a part.

Flag of Territory of Tuvalu between October 1, 1976, and October 1, 1978.

Flag of Tuvalu from October 1, 1978, to October 1, 1995.

From October to December 1995, Tuvalu slightly changed the flag, reducing the number of stars by one (the flag was a light blue ensign).

Flag of Tuvalu between January 1996 and April 11, 1997.

== 2001 to 2020 ==
Date	Event
2003	The building now occupied by the Princess Margaret Hospital was completed with the building financed by Japan.
30 April 2008	Tuvaluans rejected a constitutional referendum that proposed replacing the Queen of Tuvalu, with an elected president as the head of state.
August 2008	Tuvalu participated in the Olympic Games and sent three athletes to the Summer Olympics in Beijing to compete in the weight lifting and the men's and women's 100 metre races.
July & August 2012	Tuvalu participated in the Olympic Games and sent their top three athletes to the Summer Olympics in London to compete in the weight lift challenge and in both men's and women's 100m sprints.
September 2013	Tuau Lapua Lapua won Tuvalu's first gold medal at the 2013 Pacific Mini Games, when he won the gold medal in weightlifting in the men's 62 kilogram snatch. (He also won bronze in the clean and jerk, and obtained the silver medal for the combined event.)
5 September 2013	Tuvalu signed the Majuro Declaration, which is an initiative of the Pacific Islands Forum and which is intended to spark a “new wave of climate leadership” and to highlight the impact of climate change in the Pacific Ocean.
10 & 11 March 2015	Cyclone Pam impacted Nanumea, Nanumanga, Niutao, Nui, Nukufetau, Nukulaelae, and Vaitupu, causing tidal surges estimated to be 3–5 m (9.8–16.4 ft).
July 2015	Telupe Iosefa won Tuvalu's first gold medal at the Pacific Games in the powerlifting 120 kg male division.
December 2015	Tuvalu participated in the 2015 United Nations Climate Change Conference (COP21), which resulted in the Paris Agreement, a global agreement to use best efforts to reduce global warming "to well below 2 degrees C".
August 2016	Etimoni Timuani was the sole representative of Tuvalu at the 2016 Summer Olympics in the 100 metres event.
June 2017	Tuvalu signed the Pacific Agreement on Closer Economic Relations (PACER).

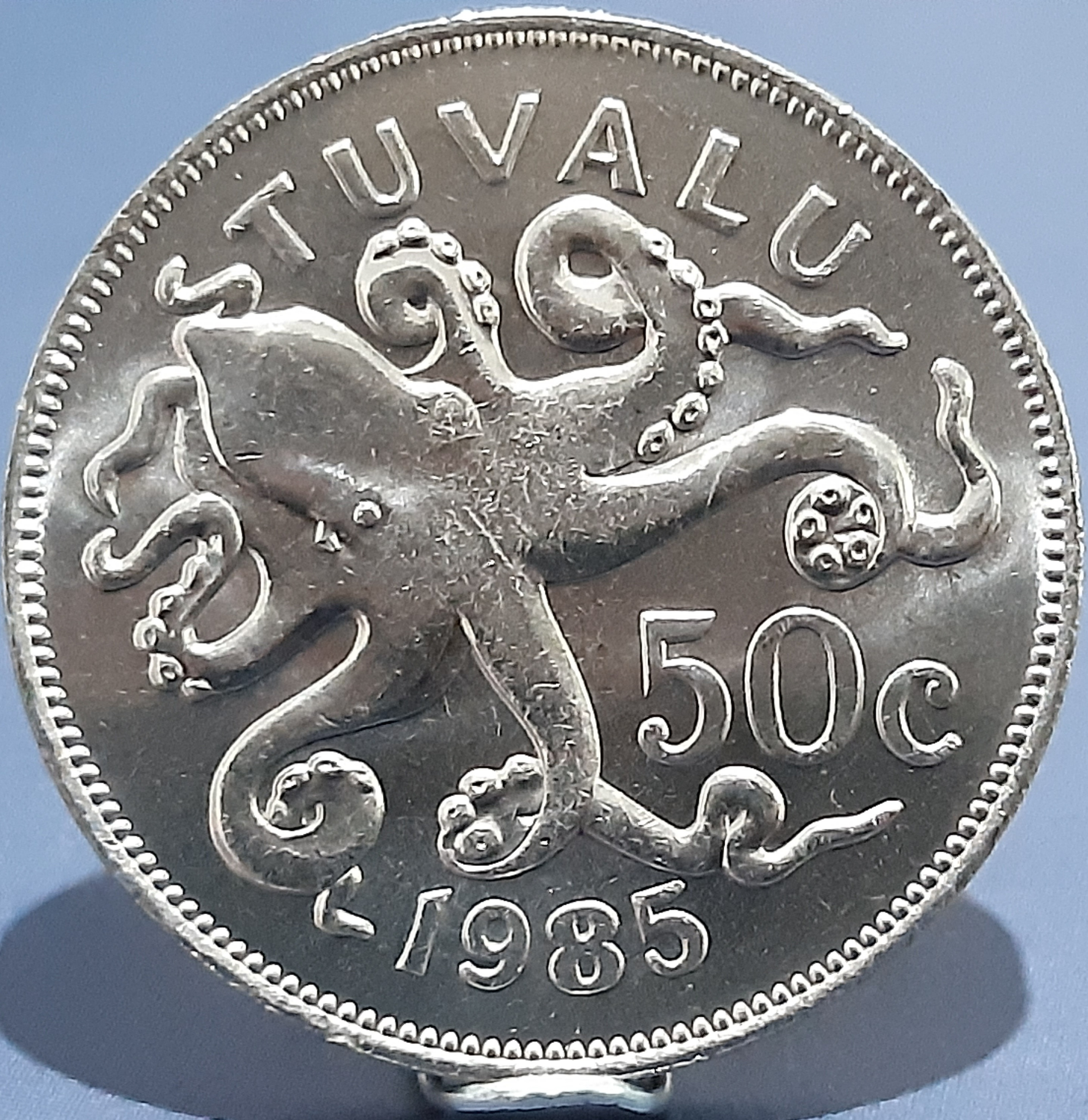
Tuvalu $0,50 (A)

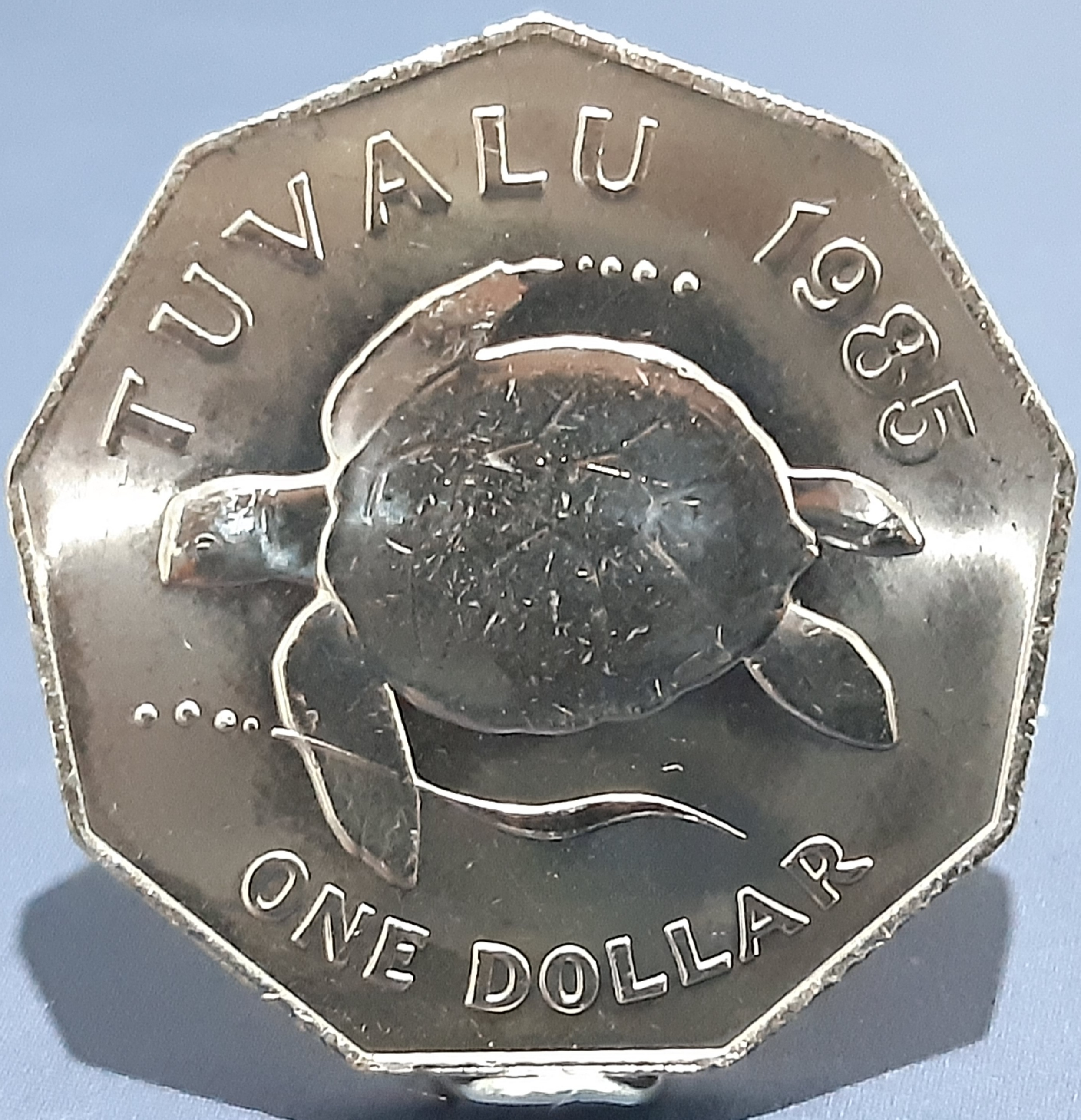
Tuvalu $1,00 (A)

== 2021 to present ==
Date	Event
July 2021	Karalo Maibuca and Matie Stanley represented Tuvalu in the men's and woman's 100m sprint events at the 2020 Summer Olympics, which had been postponed due to the COVID-19 pandemic.
1 October 2023	The Constitution of Tuvalu Act 2023 came into effect.
10 November 2023	Tuvalu signed the Falepili Union, a bilateral diplomatic relationship with Australia.
31 July 2026	Tarona Taafaki won Tuvalu's first ever Commonwealth Games medal, a bronze in the women's 75 kg boxing event.

== See also ==
- History of Oceania
- History of the Pacific Islands
- Exploration of the Pacific
- History of Tuvalu

== References and literature ==
History

- Tuvalu: A History (1983) Isala, Tito and Larcy, Hugh (eds.), Institute of Pacific Studies, University of the South Pacific and Government of Tuvalu
- Pulekai A. Sogivalu, Brief History of Niutao, A, (1992) Published by the Institute of Pacific Studies. ISBN 982020058X
- Macdonald, Barrie, Cinderellas of the Empire: towards a history of Kiribati and Tuvalu, Institute of Pacific Studies, University of the South Pacific, Suva, Fiji, (2001). ISBN 982-02-0335-X (Australian National University Press, first published 1982)
