= Tuvalu at the 2024 Summer Olympics =

- IOC code: TUV
- NOC: Tuvalu Association of Sports and National Olympic Committee
- Website: www.oceaniasport.com/tuvalu

in Paris, France 26 July 2024 – 11 August 2024
- Competitors: 2 (1 man and 1 woman) in 1 sport
- Flag bearers (opening): Karalo Maibuca; Temalini Manatoa
- Flag bearer (closing): Karalo Maibuca
- Medals: Gold 0 Silver 0 Bronze 0 Total 0

Summer Olympics appearances (overview)
- 2008; 2012; 2016; 2020; 2024

Tuvalu competed at the 2024 Summer Olympics in Paris, France, which were held from 26 July to 11 August 2024. The country's participation in Paris marked its fifth appearance at the Summer Olympics since its debut in 2008. The athlete delegation of the country was composed of two people: Karalo Maibuca and Temalini Manatoa, both competing in athletics. The delegation was supported by a collaboration between the Australian Government and the Australian Olympic Committee, which was made for the development of sport in Pacific nations.

Maibuca and Manatoa qualified for the games after receiving universality slots in their events, which allows underrepresented nations to compete and permits for a National Olympic Committee (NOC) to send athletes despite not meeting the other qualification criteria. Manatoa competed in the women's 100 metres but ran in a time not fast enough to progress into further rounds, though she set a personal best in the event. Similarly, Maibuca ran in the men's 100 metres and also did not progress further after not finishing with a fast enough time, though set a new Tuvaluan national record in the event. Thus, Tuvalu has yet to win an Olympic medal.

== Background ==
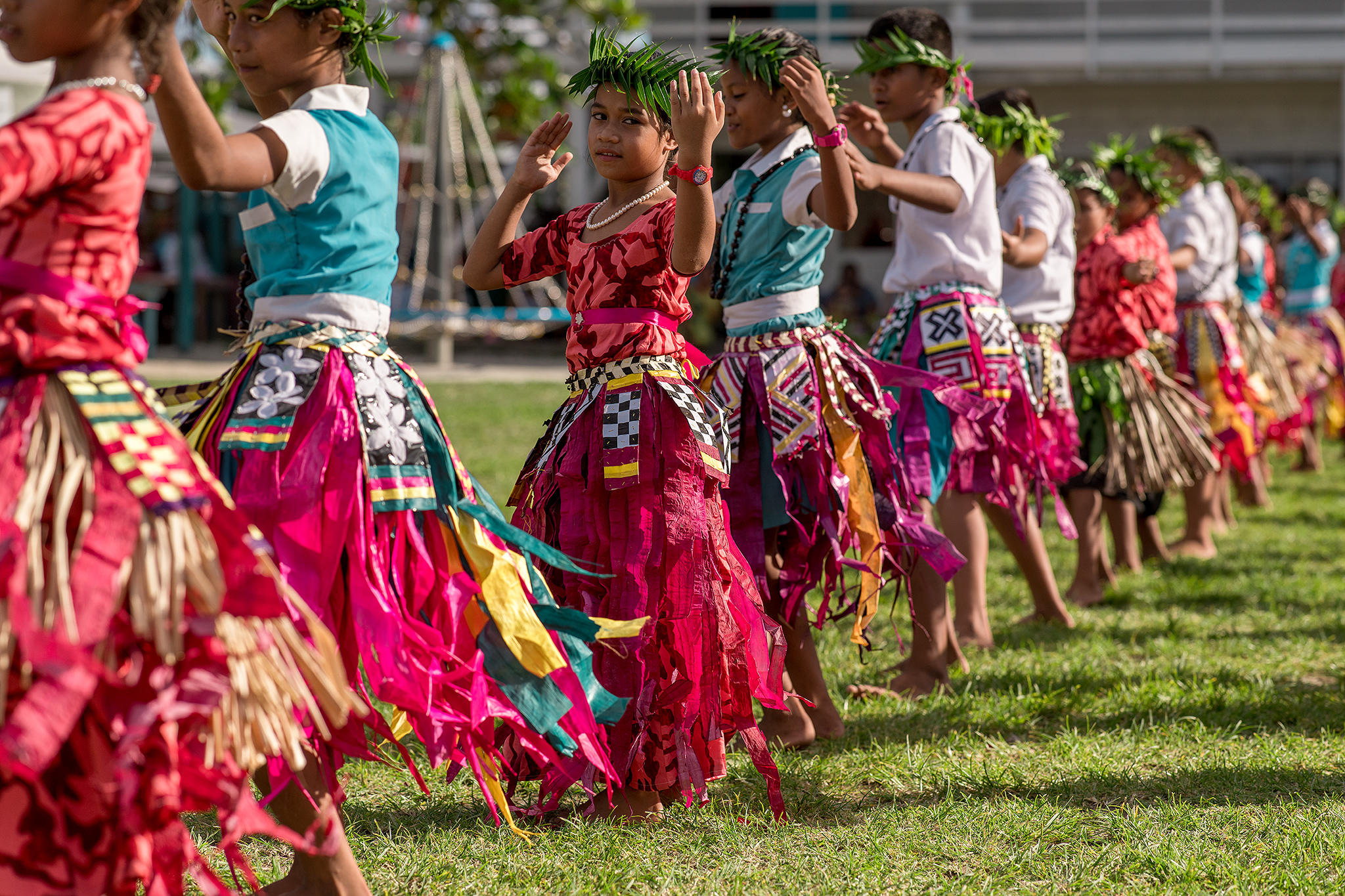
Traditional Tuvaluan clothing similar to the delegation's for the opening ceremony

The games were held from 26 July to 11 August 2024, in the city of Paris, France. This edition of the games marked Tuvalu's fifth appearance at the Summer Olympics since its debut at the 2008 Summer Olympics in Beijing, China. No athlete from Tuvalu had ever won a medal at the Olympics; the best performance was the eleventh place of weightlifter Tuau Lapua Lapua in the men's 62 kg event at the 2012 Summer Olympics in London, England.

In the lead-up to the games, the Australian Government announced a collaboration with the Australian Olympic Committee to assist over 230 athletes from 13 Pacific nations (Note: Among the nations that were supported for the games included the Cook Islands, the Federated States of Micronesia, Kiribati, the Marshall Islands, Palau, Papua New Guinea, Samoa, Tonga, Tuvalu, and Vanuatu.) for the 2024 Summer Olympics and 2024 Summer Paralympics, which included the Marshall Islands. The collaboration was made to create opportunities for said nations to compete in international competition, gain access to coaching, and to develop sports diplomacy. To announce the partnership, para table tennis player Ioane Hawaii hosted an exhibition game with High Commissioner of Australia to Tuvalu Brenton Garlick. The delegation went to a training camp in Divonne-les-Bains with other Pacific athletes for their preparations for the games.

=== Opening and closing ceremonies ===
The Tuvaluan delegation came in 192nd out of the 205 National Olympic Committees in the 2024 Summer Olympics Parade of Nations within the opening ceremony. Maibacua and Manatoa held the flag for the delegation in the parade. They wore traditional Tuvaluan attire for the ceremony. At the closing ceremony, Maibuca held the flag.

== Competitors ==
List of Tuvaluan competitors at the 2024 Summer Olympics
Sport	Men	Women	Total
Athletics	1	1	2
Total	1	1	2

== Athletics ==
=== Qualification and lead-up to the games ===
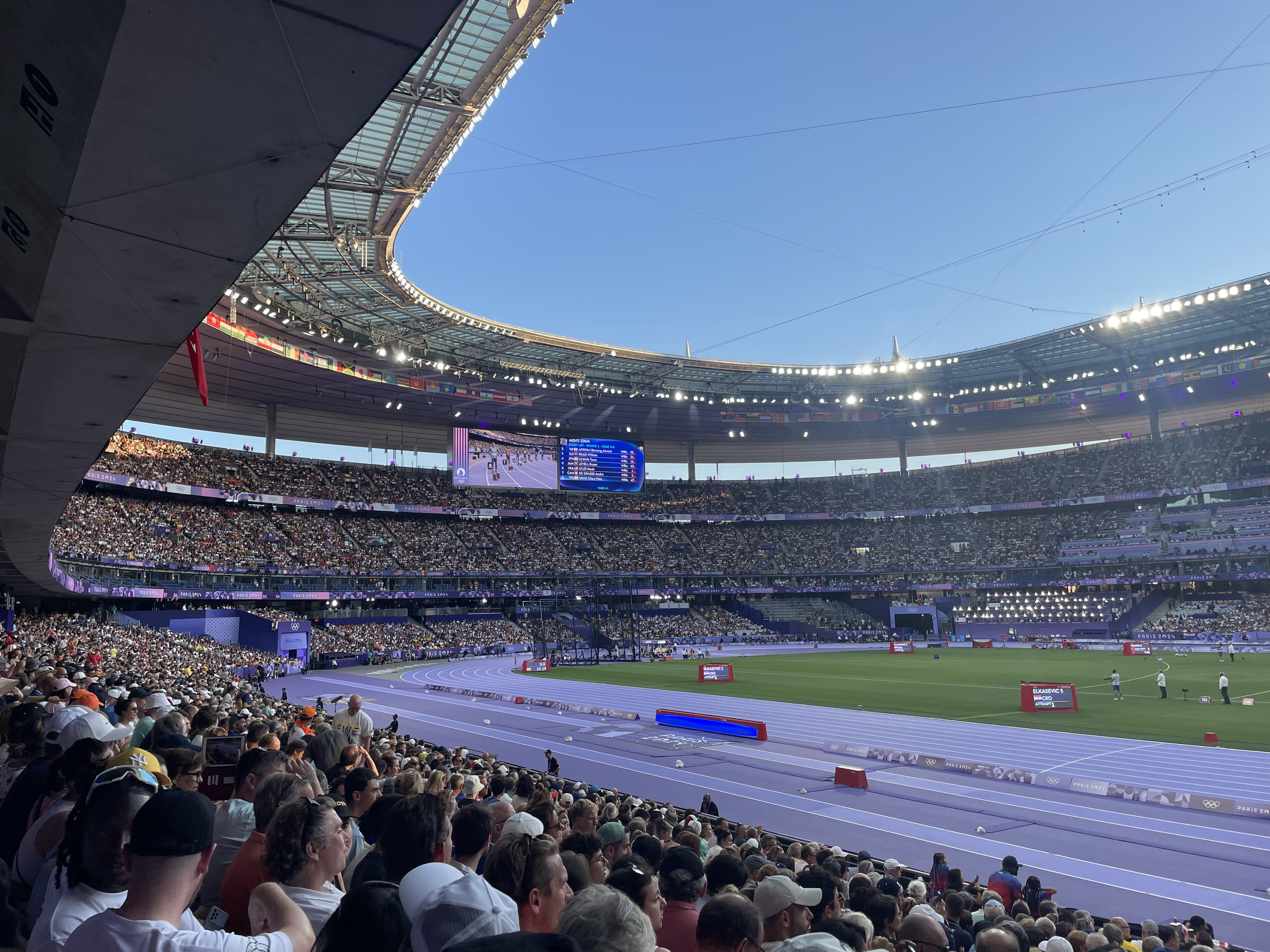
The Stade de France, where Maibuca and Manatoa competed in their events

Tuvalu was eligible for universality slots to send athletics competitors to the games, which allows a National Olympic Committee to send athletes despite not meeting the standard qualification criteria. The nation selected sprinters Karalo Maibuca and Temalini Manatoa, who would compete in the men's 100 metres and women's 100 metres respectively. Maibuca was a returning Olympian, having competed previously at the 2020 Summer Olympics in Tokyo, Japan, in the same event, though he did not qualify for further rounds after the heats (preliminary rounds).

Prior to the games, Maibuca left the nation to study and train at the University of the South Pacific in Suva, Fiji. He trained abroad as Tuvalu does not have an athletics track, with the Funafuti International Airport's runway often being used as a replacement track. He aimed to surpass his national record and personal best in the 100 metres of 11.42 seconds that he set at the previous Summer Games.

=== Event ===
The athletics events were held at the Stade de France. Manatoa competed in the preliminary rounds of the women's 100 meters on 2 August 2024 at 10:59 a.m., (Note: All times are Central European Summer Time (UTC+2)) where she raced in the fourth round. She ran in a time of 14.04 seconds for a new personal best in the event, placed eighth out of the nine people in her round, and did not advance further. After her round, she was seen in tears with a team attaché pulling her aside. She thanked her coach and parents after her performance, stating, "I'm doing my best." The eventual winner of the event was Julien Alfred of Saint Lucia, who won with a time of 10.72 and earned Saint Lucia's first Olympic medal.

Maibuca competed in his event on 2 August 2024 at 10:35 a.m., which was held at the Stade de France. He raced in the first heat of the preliminary round against seven other competitors. He finished with a time of 11.30 seconds, placed last in the heat, and did not progress further. Despite not progressing, he set a new personal best and a national record in the event. Noah Lyles of the United States eventually won the gold in a time of 9.784 seconds.

Key

- Note–Ranks given for track events are within the athlete's heat only
- PB = Personal best
- NR = National record

Track & road events

Athletics summary
Athlete	Event	Preliminary		Heats		Semifinals		Final	
Athlete	Event	Result	Rank	Result	Rank	Result	Rank	Result	Rank
Karalo Maibuca	Men's 100 m	11.30 NR	7	Did not advance					
Temalini Manatoa	Women's 100 m	14.04 PB	8	Did not advance					

== See also ==
- Tuvalu at the 2023 Pacific Games
- Tuvalu at the Olympics
