= Tuvalu at the Olympics =

- IOC code: TUV
- NOC: Tuvalu Association of Sports and National Olympic Committee
- Website: www.oceaniasport.com/tuvalu
- Medals: Gold 0 Silver 0 Bronze 0 Total 0

Summer appearances
- 2008; 2012; 2016; 2020; 2024

Tuvalu participated for the first time at the Summer Olympic Games in 2008 and has sent athletes to compete in every Summer Games since then. The nation has not competed at the Winter Olympic Games.

The Tuvalu Association of Sports and National Olympic Committee was recognised as a National Olympic Committee in July 2007. Tuvalu entered the Olympics for the first time at the 2008 Summer Olympics in Beijing, China, with a weightlifter and two athletes in the men's and women's 100-metre sprints. Tuvaluan athletes have yet to progress past the first round of their events.

== National Olympic Committee ==
The Tuvalu Association of Sports and National Olympic Committee (TASNOC) was founded in 2004 under the name 'Tuvalu Association of Sports'. It was renamed to TASNOC and recognized by the IOC as a National Olympic Committee (NOC) on 16 July 2007. Robert Laupula managed the Tuvalu Sports Association and the application for membership of the Olympic movement, which was co-ordinated by the Oceania National Olympic Committees. The TASNOC organizes Tuvalu's participation in the Commonwealth Games as well as the Olympics. The committee has had three different secretaries general: Isala T. Isala is the current secretary general, and Eselealofa Apinelu is the president.

== Olympics overview ==
Tuvalu NOC logo

=== 2008 Summer Olympics ===
Tuvalu sent three athletes to the 2008 Summer Olympics: two in athletics and one in weightlifting. Both Okilani Tinilau and Asenate Manoa set national records in the 100 metres, with times of 11.48 and 14.05 respectively. They were both eliminated in the first heat. Logona Esau finished 21st in the men's −69 kg competition.

=== 2012 Summer Olympics ===
Three Tuvaluan competitors represented the country at the 2012 Olympics. Weightlifter Tuau Lapua Lapua finished the highest of the Tuvaluan competitors with an 11th place finish in the Men's −62 kg event, finishing with a score of 243. Tavevele Noa and Asenate Manoa were both eliminated in the first heats of the 100 metres, and Manoa set a national record in the women's 100 metres.

=== 2016 Summer Olympics ===
One athlete competed for Tuvalu in the 2016 Summer Olympics, the only country to send one delegate. Etimoni Timuani competed in the 100 metres, finishing seventh in his heat. He did not advance to the next round.

=== 2020 Summer Olympics ===
Tuvalu was represented in athletic events by Karalo Maibuca in the men’s 100 metres, and Matie Stanley in the women’s 100 metres.

=== 2024 Summer Olympics ===
Tuvalu was represented in athletic events by Karalo Maibuca in the men's 100m, and Temalini Manatoa in the women's 100m.

== Medal tables ==
Games	Athletes	Gold	Silver	Bronze	Total	Rank
(China) 2008 Beijing	3	0	0	0	0	–
(United Kingdom) 2012 London	3	0	0	0	0	–
(Brazil) 2016 Rio de Janeiro	1	0	0	0	0	–
(Japan) 2020 Tokyo	2	0	0	0	0	–
(France) 2024 Paris	2	0	0	0	0	–
(United States) 2028 Los Angeles	future event					
(Australia) 2032 Brisbane	future event					
Total		0	0	0	0	–

== Flag bearers ==
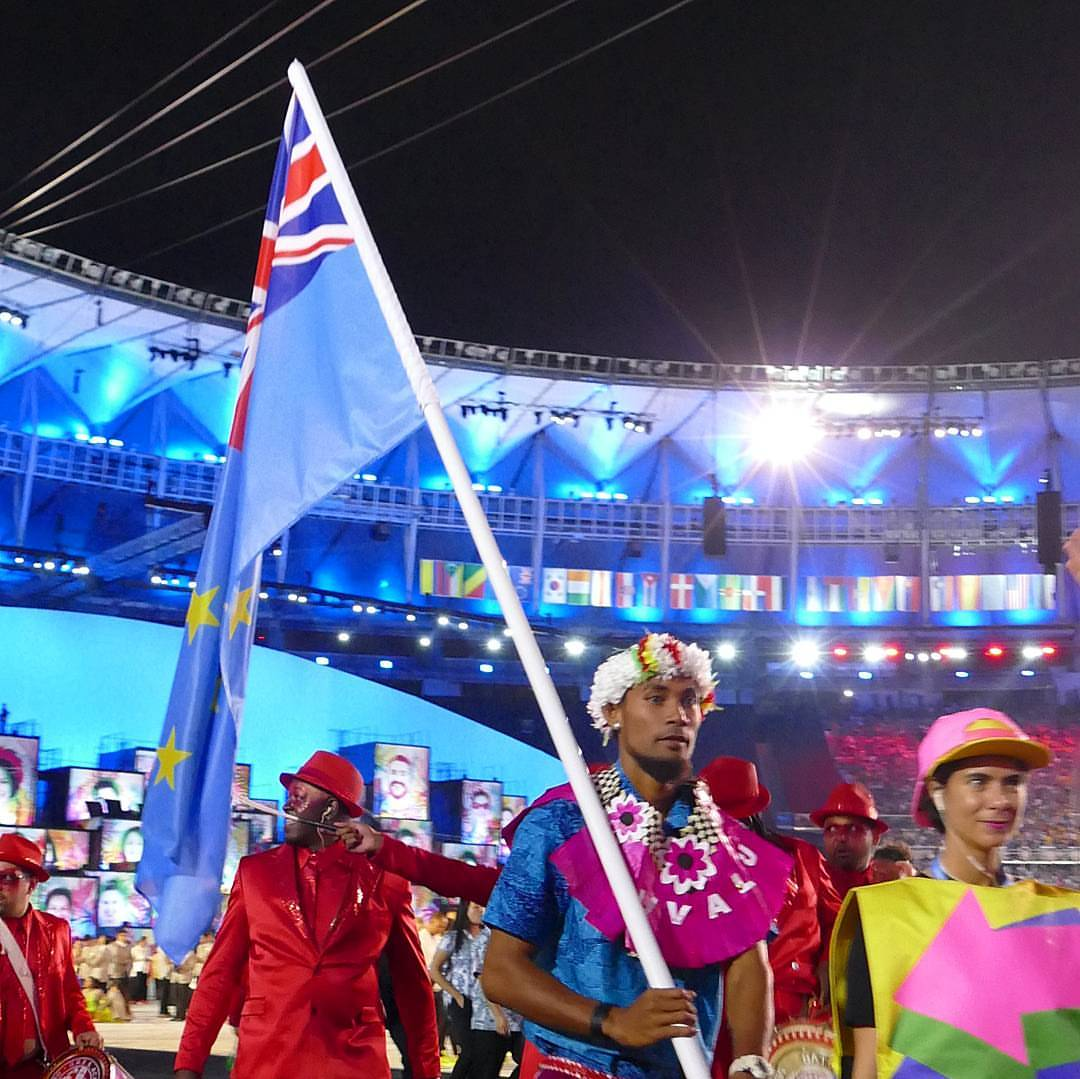
Etimoni Timuani during the Parade of Nations in the 2016 Rio Summer Olympics.

Flag bearers carry the national flag of their country at the opening ceremony and closing ceremony of the Olympic Games. The first flag bearer for Tuvalu was Logona Esau, a weightlifter, in 2008.

Summer Olympics
Games	Athlete	Sport	Notes
2008 Beijing	Logona Esau	Weightlifting	
2012 London	Tuau Lapua Lapua (opening); Asenate Manoa (closing)	Weightlifting; Athletics	
2016 Rio de Janeiro	Etimoni Timuani	Athletics	
2020 Tokyo	Karalo Maibuca and Matie Stanley	Athletics	
2024 Paris	Karalo Maibuca and Temalini Manatoa	Athletics	

== See also ==
- List of Tuvaluan records in athletics
