= Tuvalu at the World Athletics Championships =

Sporting event delegation

- WA code: TUV
- National federation: Tuvalu Athletics Association
- Website: athletics-oceania.com/tuvalu/
- Medals: Gold 0 Silver 0 Bronze 0 Total 0

World Athletics Championships appearances (overview)
- 2009; 2011; 2013; 2015; 2017; 2019; 2022; 2023; 2025

Tuvalu sends athletes to the World Athletics Championships to compete in the 100 metres. The sprinters have set Tuvaluan records and personal best times, but have not proceeded beyond the preliminary heats. The Tuvalu Athletics Association (TAA) is the governing body for the sport of athletics in the Tuvalu.

== History ==
| World Championships | Athlete | Event | Performance |
|---|---|---|---|
| 2009 World Championships in Athletics | Okilani Tinilau | men's 100 metres | 11.57 s. |
| 2009 World Championships in Athletics | Asenate Manoa | women's 100 metres | 13.75 s. |
| 2011 World Championships in Athletics | Okilani Tinilau | men's 100 metres | 11.58 s. |
| 2011 World Championships in Athletics | Asenate Manoa | women's 100 metres | 13.92 s. |
| 2013 World Championships in Athletics | Okilani Tinilau | men's 100 metres | 11.57 s. |
| 2015 World Championships in Athletics | Etimoni Timuani | men's 100 metres | 11.72 s. |
| 2022 World Championships in Athletics | Karalo Maibuca | men's 100 metres | 11.46 s. |
| 2023 World Championships in Athletics | Karalo Maibuca | men's 100 metres | 11.55 s. |

== Results ==
Key

- Q = Qualified for the next round
- q = Qualified for the next round as a fastest loser or, in field events, by position without achieving the qualifying target
- NR = National record
- PB = Personal best
- SB = Season best
- N/A = Round not applicable for the event

=== 2009 ===
Tuvalu competed at the 2009 World Championships in Athletics from 15–23 August. A team of 2 athletes was announced in preparation for the competition.

==== Men ====
| Athlete | Event | Preliminaries | | Heats | | Semifinals | | Final | |
| Athlete | Event | Time Width Height | Rank | Time Width Height | Rank | Time Width Height | Rank | Time Width Height | Rank |
|---|---|---|---|---|---|---|---|---|---|
| Okilani Tinilau | 100 metres | 11.57 | SB | Did not advance | | | | | |

==== Women ====
| Athlete | Event | Preliminaries | | Heats | | Semifinals | | Final | |
| Athlete | Event | Time Width Height | Rank | Time Width Height | Rank | Time Width Height | Rank | Time Width Height | Rank |
|---|---|---|---|---|---|---|---|---|---|
| Asenate Manoa | 100 metres | 13.75 | NR | Did not advance | | | | | |

=== 2011 ===
Tuvalu competed at the 2011 World Championships in Athletics from August 27 to September 4 in Daegu, South Korea. A team of 2 athletes was announced to represent the country in the event.

==== Men ====
| Athlete | Event | Preliminaries | | Heats | | Semifinals | | Final | |
| Athlete | Event | Time Width Height | Rank | Time Width Height | Rank | Time Width Height | Rank | Time Width Height | Rank |
|---|---|---|---|---|---|---|---|---|---|
| Okilani Tinilau | 100 metres | 11.58 | 24 | Did not advance | | | | | |

==== Women ====
| Athlete | Event | Preliminaries | | Heats | | Semifinals | | Final | |
| Athlete | Event | Time Width Height | Rank | Time Width Height | Rank | Time Width Height | Rank | Time Width Height | Rank |
|---|---|---|---|---|---|---|---|---|---|
| Asenate Manoa | 100 metres | 13.92 | 32 | Did not advance | | | | | |

=== 2013 ===
Tuvalu was represented by Okilani Tinilau at the 2013 World Championships in Athletics in Moscow, Russia, from 10–18 August 2013. He competed in the 100 metres sprint and achieved a time of 11.57 seconds in the heats and did not proceed to the semi-finals.

=== 2015 ===
One athlete from Tuvalu appeared in competition at the 2015 World Championships in Athletics in Beijing, China, from 22–30 August 2015.

==== Men ====
Track and road events

| Athlete | Event | Preliminary Round | | Heat | | Semifinal | | Final | |
| Athlete | Event | Result | Rank | Result | Rank | Result | Rank | Result | Rank |
|---|---|---|---|---|---|---|---|---|---|
| Etimoni Timuani | 100 metres | 11.72 PB | 23 | did not advance | | | | | |

=== 2017 ===
Tuvalu sent one male athlete to compete at the 2017 World Championships in Athletics in London, United Kingdom, from 4–13 August 2017.

==== Men ====
Track and road events

| Athlete | Event | Preliminary Round | | Heat | | Semifinal | | Final | |
| Athlete | Event | Result | Rank | Result | Rank | Result | Rank | Result | Rank |
|---|---|---|---|---|---|---|---|---|---|
| Ielu Tamoa | 100 metres | 12.12 PB | 28 | Did not advance | | | | | |

=== 2022 ===
Tuvalu appeared at the 2022 World Athletics Championships in Eugene, United States, from 15 to 24 July 2022, entering 1 athlete.

=== Men ===
Track and road events

| Athlete | Event | Preliminary | | Heat | | Semi-final | | Final | |
| Athlete | Event | Result | Rank | Result | Rank | Result | Rank | Result | Rank |
|---|---|---|---|---|---|---|---|---|---|
| Karalo Maibuca | 100 m | 11.46 | 19 | Did not advance | | | | | |

=== 2023 ===
Tuvalu competed at the 2023 World Athletics Championships in Budapest, Hungary, which were held from 19 to 27 August 2023. The athlete delegation of the country was composed of one competitor, sprinter Karalo Maibuca who would compete in the men's 100 metres. He qualified upon being selected by the Tuvalu Athletics Association. In the preliminaries of the event, he would set a new season's best in the event. He placed sixth in the round and did not advance to the heats of the event.
