= Tuvalu at the 2023 World Athletics Championships =

- Flag of Tuvalu
- WA code: TUV

in Budapest, Hungary 19 August 2023 – 27 August 2023
- Competitors: 1 (1 man and 0 women)
- Medals: Gold 0 Silver 0 Bronze 0 Total 0

World Athletics Championships appearances (overview)
- 2009; 2011; 2013; 2015; 2017; 2019; 2022; 2023

Tuvalu competed at the 2023 World Athletics Championships in Budapest, Hungary, which were held from 19 to 27 August 2023. The athlete delegation of the country was composed of one competitor, sprinter Karalo Maibuca who would compete in the men's 100 metres. He qualified upon being selected by the Tuvalu Athletics Association. In the preliminaries of the event, he would set a new season's best in the event. He placed sixth in the round and did not advance to the heats of the event.

== Background ==
The 2023 World Athletics Championships in Budapest, Hungary, were held from 19 to 27 August 2023. The Championships were held at the National Athletics Centre. To qualify for the World Championships, athletes had to reach an entry standard (e.g. time or distance), place in a specific position at select competitions, be a wild card entry, or qualify through their World Athletics Ranking at the end of the qualification period.

As Tuvalu did not meet any of the four standards, they could send either one male or one female athlete in one event of the Championships who has not yet qualified. The Tuvalu Athletics Association selected sprinter Karalo Maibuca who had previously competed for the nation at the 2022 World Athletics Championships that were held a year prior.

== Results ==
Key

- Q = Qualified for the next round
- q = Qualified for the next round as a fastest loser or, in field events, by position without achieving the qualifying target
- NR = National record
- PB = Personal best
- SB = Season best
- N/A = Round not applicable for the event

=== Men ===
Maibuca competed in the preliminary rounds of the men's 100 metres on 19 August against six other competitors in his round. After he raced in the first heat, he set a time of 11.55 seconds for a new season's best. He placed sixth in his round and did not advance to the heats of the event.

Track and road events

| Athlete | Event | Preliminary | | Heat | | Semifinal | | Final | |
| Athlete | Event | Result | Rank | Result | Rank | Result | Rank | Result | Rank |
|---|---|---|---|---|---|---|---|---|---|
| Karalo Maibuca | 100 metres | 11.55 SB | 6 | Did not advance | | | | | |
