= Tuvalu at the 2020 Summer Olympics =

- IOC code: TUV
- NOC: Tuvalu Association of Sports and National Olympic Committee
- Website: www.oceaniasport.com/tuvalu

in Tokyo, Japan July 23, 2021 – August 8, 2021
- Competitors: 2 in 1 sport
- Flag bearers (opening): Matie Stanley; Karalo Maibuca
- Flag bearer (closing): Karalo Maibuca
- Medals: Gold 0 Silver 0 Bronze 0 Total 0

Summer Olympics appearances (overview)
- 2008; 2012; 2016; 2020; 2024

Tuvalu competed at the 2020 Summer Olympics in Tokyo, which were held from 23 July to 8 August 2021. Originally scheduled to take place from 24 July to 9 August 2020, the event was postponed due to the COVID-19 pandemic. Their participation marked their fourth consecutive appearance at the Summer Olympics since their debut at the 2008 Summer Olympics. The Tuvaluan delegation consisted of the sprinters Karalo Maibuca and Matie Stanley, both of whom were competing in their first Olympics. Neither Maibuca nor Stanley managed to progress beyond the preliminary rounds of their events, although Maibuca set a Tuvaluan national record of 11.42 seconds in the men's 100 metres.

== Background ==
Tuvalu is an island country located in Polynesia in the Pacific Ocean. Formerly a colony of the United Kingdom, it gained independence in 1978. The Tuvalu Association of Sports and National Olympic Committee was formed in 2004, and was recognized by the International Olympic Committee in 2007. Tuvalu first participated in the Summer Olympics in 2008, and have appeared in two more Summer Olympics before the 2020 Summer Olympics. However, they have never won an Olympic medal.

The 2020 Summer Olympics were originally due to be held from 24 July to 9 August 2020, but were delayed to 23 July to 8 August 2021 due to the COVID-19 pandemic. For the 2020 Summer Olympics, Tuvalu sent a delegation of two athletes, one of 13 countries to do so. The athletes were the sprinters Karalo Maibuca and Matie Stanley, who competed in the men's and women's 100 metres, respectively. Stanley and Maibuca respectively were the female and male flag bearers during the opening ceremony, while Maibuca was the flag bearer during the closing ceremony.

== Competitors ==
The following is a list of number of competitors in the Games and selected biographies.

Sport	Men	Women	Total
Athletics	1	1	2
Total	1	1	2

=== Matie Stanley ===
Matie Stanley
Personal information
- Born: 4 May 2003 (age 22)

Sport
- Event: Sprints
- Coached by: Etimoni Timuani

Matie Stanley (born 4 May 2003) is a Tuvaluan sprinter.

She was selected to compete in the women's 100 metres at the 2020 Summer Games and was given the honour of being the flag bearer for her nation in the opening ceremony alongside Karalo Maibuca. In the preliminary heats, Stanley placed 8th in her heat with a personal best time of 14.52 seconds, and did not qualify for the next round. She was said to have had a rapid rise since starting athletics in 2018.

== Athletics ==
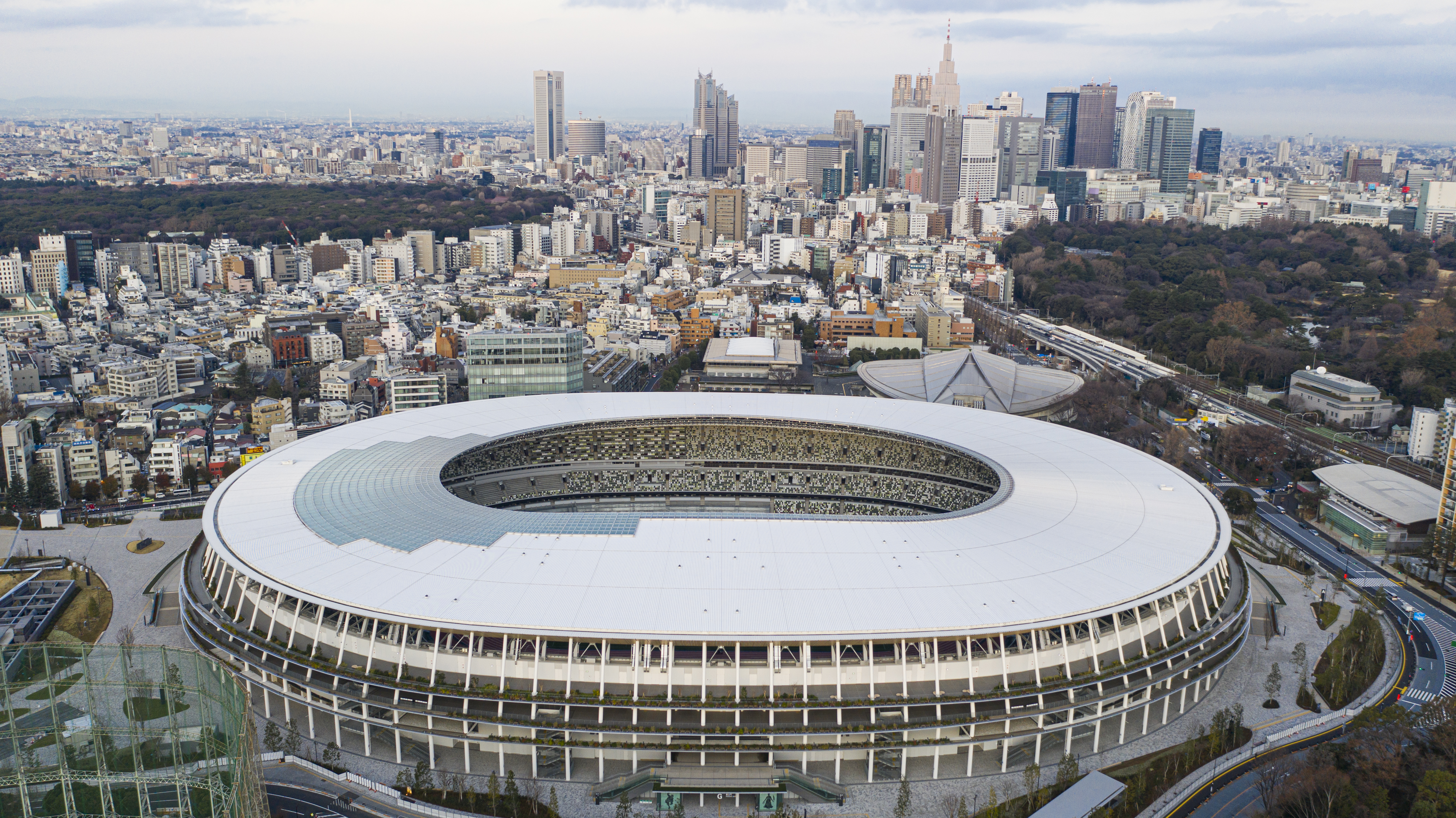
The Japan National Stadium, where the athletics events were hosted

Tuvalu received a universality slot (a quota allowing nations to send athletes if no one has qualified for the event) from the International Olympic Committee to send two athletes in athletics, one male and one female, to the Olympics. It chose to send 22 year-old Karalo Maibuca and 18 year-old Matie Stanley, both of whom were participating in their first Olympics.

Maibuca finished ninth in his heat and did not advance past the preliminary round, but set a new Tuvaluan national record of 11.42 seconds. Stanley finished eighth out of nine runners in her heat and also did not advance past the preliminary round, setting a personal best time of 14.52 seconds.

Key

- Note–Ranks given for track events are within the athlete's heat only
- NR = National record

Track & road events

Athlete	Event	Heat		Quarterfinal		Semifinal		Final	
Athlete	Event	Result	Rank	Result	Rank	Result	Rank	Result	Rank
Karalo Maibuca	Men's 100 m	11.42 NR	9	Did not advance					
Matie Stanley	Women's 100 m	14.52	8	Did not advance					

== See also ==
- Tuvalu at the Olympics
