= List of participating nations at the Winter Youth Olympic Games =

This is a list of nations, as represented by National Olympic Committees (NOCs), that have participated in the Winter Olympic Games between 2012 and 2024. The Winter Youth Olympic Games have been held every four years since 2012. 66 NOCs (105 of the current 206 NOCs) have participated in at least one Winter Games, and Seventy nations in all two Winter Youth Olympic Games date.

== List of nations ==
=== Table legend ===
12	In the table headings, indicates the Games year
•	Participated in the specified Games
H	Host nation for the specified Games

=== Alphabetical list ===
A	Code	12	16	20	24
Albania	ALB			•	
Algeria	ALG				•
Andorra	AND	•	•	•	•
Argentina	ARG	•	•	•	•
Armenia	ARM	•	•	•	•
Australia	AUS	•	•	•	•
Austria	AUT	H	•	•	•
Azerbaijan	AZE			•	
B	Code	12	16	20	24
Belarus	BLR	•	•	•	
Belgium	BEL	•	•	•	•
Bosnia and Herzegovina	BIH	•	•	•	•
Brazil	BRA	•	•	•	•
Bulgaria	BUL	•	•	•	•
C	Code	12	16	20	24
Canada	CAN	•	•	•	•
Cayman Islands	CAY	•			
Chile	CHI	•	•	•	•
China	CHN	•	•	•	•
Chinese Taipei	TPE	•	•	•	•
Colombia	COL		•	•	•
Croatia	CRO	•	•	•	•
Cyprus	CYP	•	•	•	•
Czech Republic	CZE	•	•	•	•
D	Code	12	16	20	24
Denmark	DEN	•	•	•	•
E	Code	12	16	20	24
Timor-Leste	TLS		•		
Ecuador	ECU			•	
Eritrea	ERI	•			
Estonia	EST	•	•	•	•
F	Code	12	16	20	24
Finland	FIN	•	•	•	•
France	FRA	•	•	•	•
G	Code	12	16	20	24
Georgia	GEO	•	•	•	•
Germany	GER	•	•	•	•
Great Britain	GBR	•	•	•	•
Greece	GRE	•	•	•	•
H	Code	12	16	20	24
Haiti	HAI			•	
Hong Kong	HKG			•	•
Hungary	HUN	•	•	•	•
I	Code	12	16	20	24
Iceland	ISL	•	•	•	•
India	IND	•	•		•
Iran	IRI	•	•	•	•
Ireland	IRL	•	•	•	•
Israel	ISR		•	•	•
Italy	ITA	•	•	•	•
J	Code	12	16	20	24
Jamaica	JAM		•		•
Japan	JPN	•	•	•	•
K	Code	12	16	20	24
Kazakhstan	KAZ	•	•	•	•
Kenya	KEN		•		•
South Korea	KOR	•	•	•	H
Kosovo	KOS			•	•
Kyrgyzstan	KGZ	•	•	•	•
L	Code	12	16	20	24
Latvia	LAT	•	•	•	•
Lebanon	LIB	•	•	•	•
Liechtenstein	LIE	•	•	•	•
Lithuania	LTU	•	•	•	•
Luxembourg	LUX	•	•	•	
M	Code	12	16	20	24
Malaysia	MAS		•	•	
Mexico	MEX	•	•	•	•
Moldova	MDA	•	•	•	•
Monaco	MON	•	•		•
Mongolia	MGL	•	•	•	•
Montenegro	MNE	•	•	•	•
Morocco	MAR	•			
N	Code	12	16	20	24
Nepal	NEP	•	•		•
Netherlands	NED	•	•	•	•
New Zealand	NZL	•	•	•	•
Nigeria	NGR				•
North Macedonia	MKD	•	•	•	•
Norway	NOR	•	H	•	•
P	Code	12	16	20	24
Pakistan	PAK			•	
Peru	PER	•			
Philippines	PHI	•		•	•
Poland	POL	•	•	•	•
Portugal	POR		•	•	•
Puerto Rico	PUR				•
Q	Code	12	16	20	24
Qatar	QAT			•	•
R	Code	12	16	20	24
Romania	ROU	•	•	•	•
Russia	RUS	•	•	•	
S	Code	12	16	20	24
San Marino	SMR	•	•	•	•
Serbia	SRB	•	•	•	•
Singapore	SGP			•	•
Slovakia	SVK	•	•	•	•
Slovenia	SLO	•	•	•	•
South Africa	RSA	•	•	•	•
Spain	ESP	•	•	•	•
Sweden	SWE	•	•	•	•
Switzerland	SUI	•	•	H	•
T	Code	12	16	20	24
Thailand	THA			•	•
Trinidad and Tobago	TRI			•	
Tunisia	TUN				•
Turkey	TUR	•	•	•	•
Turkmenistan	TKM			•	
U	Code	12	16	20	24
Ukraine	UKR	•	•	•	•
United Arab Emirates	UAE				•
United States	USA	•	•	•	•
Uzbekistan	UZB	•		•	•
Other entries	Code	12	16	20	24
Mixed team[^]	ZZX				
Total		69	71	79	78

=== Nations that have never competed ===
112 of the 206 active NOCs have yet to compete in a Winter Youth Olympics.

Nation	Code
Afghanistan	AFG
American Samoa	ASA
Angola	ANG
Antigua and Barbuda	ANT
Aruba	ARU
Bahamas	BAH
Bahrain	BRN
Bangladesh	BAN
Barbados	BAR
Belize	BIZ
Benin	BEN
Bermuda	BER
Bhutan	BHU
Bolivia	BOL
Botswana	BOT
British Virgin Islands	IVB
Brunei	BRU
Burkina Faso	BUR
Burundi	BDI
Cambodia	CAM
Cameroon	CMR
Cape Verde	CPV
Central African Republic	CAF
Chad	CHA
Comoros	COM
Republic of the Congo	CGO
Cook Islands	COK
Costa Rica	CRC
Cuba	CUB
Djibouti	DJI
Dominica	DMA
Dominican Republic	DOM
Democratic Republic of the Congo	COD
Egypt	EGY
El Salvador	ESA
Equatorial Guinea	GEQ
Ethiopia	ETH
Federated States of Micronesia	FSM
Fiji	FIJ
Gabon	GAB
The Gambia	GAM
Ghana	GHA
Grenada	GRN
Guam	GUM
Guatemala	GUA
Guinea	GUI
Guinea-Bissau	GBS
Guyana	GUY
Honduras	HON
Indonesia	INA
Iraq	IRQ
Ivory Coast	CIV
Jordan	JOR
Kiribati	KIR
Kuwait	KUW
Laos	LAO
Lesotho	LES
Liberia	LBR
Libya	LBA
Madagascar	MAD
Malawi	MAW
Maldives	MDV
Mali	MLI
Malta	MLT
Marshall Islands	MHL
Mauritania	MTN
Mauritius	MRI
Mozambique	MOZ
Myanmar	MYA
Namibia	NAM
Nauru	NRU
Nicaragua	NCA
Niger	NIG
North Korea	PRK
Oman	OMA
Palau	PLW
Palestine	PLE
Panama	PAN
Papua New Guinea	PNG
Paraguay	PAR
Rwanda	RWA
Saint Kitts and Nevis	SKN
Saint Lucia	LCA
Saint Vincent and the Grenadines	VIN
Samoa	SAM
São Tomé and Príncipe	STP
Saudi Arabia	KSA
Senegal	SEN
Seychelles	SEY
Sierra Leone	SLE
Solomon Islands	SOL
Somalia	SOM
South Sudan	SSD
Sri Lanka	SRI
Sudan	SUD
Swaziland	SWZ
Suriname	SUR
Syria	SYR
Tajikistan	TJK
Tanzania	TAN
Togo	TOG
Tonga	TGA
Tuvalu	TUV
Uganda	UGA
Uruguay	URU
Vanuatu	VAN
Venezuela	VEN
Vietnam	VIE
Virgin Islands	ISV
Yemen	YEM
Zambia	ZAM
Zimbabwe	ZIM

== See also ==
- List of participating nations at the Summer Youth Olympic Games
