= List of participating nations at the Summer Youth Olympic Games =

This is a list of nations, as represented by National Olympic Committees (NOCs), that have participated in the Summer Youth Olympic Games between 2010 and 2018. As of the 2018 Games, all of the current 206 NOCs have participated in at least one edition of the Olympic Games, and two hundred and three nations in all Summer Youth Olympic Games to date.

== List of nations ==
=== Table legend ===
10	In the table headings, indicates the Games year
•	Participated in the specified Games
H	Host nation for the specified Games

=== Alphabetical list ===
A	Code	10	14	18
Afghanistan	AFG	•	•	•
Albania	ALB	•	•	•
Algeria	ALG	•	•	•
American Samoa	ASA	•	•	•
Andorra	AND	•	•	•
Angola	ANG	•	•	•
Antigua and Barbuda	ANT	•	•	•
Argentina	ARG	•	•	H
Armenia	ARM	•	•	•
Aruba	ARU	•	•	•
Australia	AUS	•	•	•
Austria	AUT	•	•	•
Azerbaijan	AZE	•	•	•
B	Code	10	14	18
Bahamas	BAH	•	•	•
Bahrain	BRN	•	•	•
Bangladesh	BAN	•	•	•
Barbados	BAR	•	•	•
Belarus	BLR	•	•	•
Belgium	BEL	•	•	•
Belize	BIZ	•	•	•
Benin	BEN	•	•	•
Bermuda	BER	•	•	•
Bhutan	BHU	•	•	•
Bolivia	BOL	•	•	•
Bosnia and Herzegovina	BIH	•	•	•
Botswana	BOT	•	•	•
Brazil	BRA	•	•	•
British Virgin Islands	IVB	•	•	•
Brunei	BRU	•	•	•
Bulgaria	BUL	•	•	•
Burkina Faso	BUR	•	•	•
Burundi	BDI	•	•	•
C	Code	10	14	18
Cambodia	CAM	•	•	•
Cameroon	CMR	•	•	•
Canada	CAN	•	•	•
Cape Verde	CPV	•	•	•
Cayman Islands	CAY	•	•	•
Central African Republic	CAF	•	•	•
Chad	CHA	•	•	•
Chile	CHI	•	•	•
China	CHN	•	H	•
Chinese Taipei	TPE	•	•	•
Colombia	COL	•	•	•
Comoros	COM	•	•	•
Republic of the Congo	CGO	•	•	•
Democratic Republic of the Congo	COD	•	•	•
Cook Islands	COK	•	•	•
Costa Rica	CRC	•	•	•
Ivory Coast	CIV	•	•	•
Croatia	CRO	•	•	•
Cuba	CUB	•	•	•
Cyprus	CYP	•	•	•
Czech Republic	CZE	•	•	•
D	Code	10	14	18
Denmark	DEN	•	•	•
Djibouti	DJI	•	•	•
Dominica	DMA	•	•	•
Dominican Republic	DOM	•	•	•
E	Code	10	14	18
Ecuador	ECU	•	•	•
Egypt	EGY	•	•	•
El Salvador	ESA	•	•	•
Equatorial Guinea	GEQ	•	•	•
Eritrea	ERI	•	•	•
Estonia	EST	•	•	•
Ethiopia	ETH	•	•	•
F	Code	10	14	18
Fiji	FIJ	•	•	•
Finland	FIN	•	•	•
France	FRA	•	•	•
G	Code	10	14	18
Gabon	GAB	•	•	•
The Gambia	GAM	•	•	•
Georgia	GEO	•	•	•
Germany	GER	•	•	•
Ghana	GHA	•	•	•
Great Britain	GBR	•	•	•
Greece	GRE	•	•	•
Grenada	GRN	•	•	•
Guam	GUM	•	•	•
Guatemala	GUA	•	•	•
Guinea	GUI	•	•	•
Guinea-Bissau	GBS	•	•	•
Guyana	GUY	•	•	•
H	Code	10	14	18
Haiti	HAI	•	•	•
Honduras	HON	•	•	•
Hong Kong	HKG	•	•	•
Hungary	HUN	•	•	•
I	Code	10	14	18
Iceland	ISL	•	•	•
India	IND	•	•	•
Indonesia	INA	•	•	•
Iran	IRI	•	•	•
Iraq	IRQ	•	•	•
Ireland	IRL	•	•	•
Israel	ISR	•	•	•
Italy	ITA	•	•	•
J	Code	10	14	18
Jamaica	JAM	•	•	•
Japan	JPN	•	•	•
Jordan	JOR	•	•	•
K	Code	10	14	18
Kazakhstan	KAZ	•	•	•
Kenya	KEN	•	•	•
Kiribati	KIR	•	•	•
North Korea	PRK	•	•	•
South Korea	KOR	•	•	•
Kosovo	KOS	DNP		•
Kuwait	KUW	•	•	•
Kyrgyzstan	KGZ	•	•	•
L	Code	10	14	18
Laos	LAO	•	•	•
Latvia	LAT	•	•	•
Lebanon	LIB	•	•	•
Lesotho	LES	•	•	•
Liberia	LBR	•	•	•
Libya	LBA	•	•	•
Liechtenstein	LIE	•	•	•
Lithuania	LTU	•	•	•
Luxembourg	LUX	•	•	•
M	Code	10	14	18
North Macedonia	MKD	•	•	•
Madagascar	MAD	•	•	•
Malawi	MAW	•	•	•
Malaysia	MAS	•	•	•
Maldives	MDV	•	•	•
Mali	MLI	•	•	•
Malta	MLT	•	•	•
Marshall Islands	MHL	•	•	•
Mauritania	MTN	•	•	•
Mauritius	MRI	•	•	•
Mexico	MEX	•	•	•
Federated States of Micronesia	FSM	•	•	•
Moldova	MDA	•	•	•
Monaco	MON	•	•	•
Mongolia	MGL	•	•	•
Montenegro	MNE	•	•	•
Morocco	MAR	•	•	•
Mozambique	MOZ	•	•	•
Myanmar	MYA	•	•	•
N	Code	10	14	18
Namibia	NAM	•	•	•
Nauru	NRU	•	•	•
Nepal	NEP	•	•	•
Netherlands	NED	•	•	•
Netherlands Antilles	AHO	•		
New Zealand	NZL	•	•	•
Nicaragua	NCA	•	•	•
Niger	NIG	•	•	•
Nigeria	NGR	•		•
Norway	NOR	•	•	•
O	Code	10	14	18
Oman	OMA	•	•	•
P	Code	10	14	18
Pakistan	PAK	•	•	•
Palau	PLW	•	•	•
Palestine	PLE	•	•	•
Panama	PAN	•	•	•
Papua New Guinea	PNG	•	•	•
Paraguay	PAR	•	•	•
Peru	PER	•	•	•
Philippines	PHI	•	•	•
Poland	POL	•	•	•
Portugal	POR	•	•	•
Puerto Rico	PUR	•	•	•
Q	Code	10	14	18
Qatar	QAT	•	•	•
R	Code	10	14	18
Romania	ROU	•	•	•
Russia	RUS	•	•	•
Rwanda	RWA	•	•	•
S	Code	10	14	18
Saint Kitts and Nevis	SKN	•	•	•
Saint Lucia	LCA	•	•	•
Saint Vincent and the Grenadines	VIN	•	•	•
Samoa	SAM	•	•	•
San Marino	SMR	•	•	•
São Tomé and Príncipe	STP	•	•	•
Saudi Arabia	KSA	•	•	•
Senegal	SEN	•	•	•
Serbia	SRB	•	•	•
Seychelles	SEY	•	•	•
Sierra Leone	SLE	•		•
Singapore	SIN	H	•	•
Slovakia	SVK	•	•	•
Slovenia	SLO	•	•	•
Solomon Islands	SOL	•	•	•
Somalia	SOM	•	•	•
South Africa	RSA	•	•	•
Spain	ESP	•	•	•
Sri Lanka	SRI	•	•	•
Sudan	SUD	•	•	•
South Sudan	SSD	SUD	[^]	•
Suriname	SUR	•	•	•
Swaziland	SWZ	•	•	•
Sweden	SWE	•	•	•
Switzerland	SUI	•	•	•
Syria	SYR	•	•	•
T	Code	10	14	18
Tajikistan	TJK	•	•	•
Tanzania	TAN	•	•	•
Thailand	THA	•	•	•
Timor-Leste	TLS	•	•	•
Togo	TOG	•	•	•
Tonga	TGA	•	•	•
Trinidad and Tobago	TTO	•	•	•
Tunisia	TUN	•	•	•
Turkey	TUR	•	•	•
Turkmenistan	TKM	•	•	•
Tuvalu	TUV	•	•	•
U	Code	10	14	18
Uganda	UGA	•	•	•
Ukraine	UKR	•	•	•
United Arab Emirates	UAE	•	•	•
United States	USA	•	•	•
Uruguay	URU	•	•	•
Uzbekistan	UZB	•	•	•
V	Code	10	14	18
Vanuatu	VAN	•	•	•
Venezuela	VEN	•	•	•
Vietnam	VIE	•	•	•
Virgin Islands	ISV	•	•	•
Y	Code	10	14	18
Yemen	YEM	•	•	•
Z	Code	10	14	18
Zambia	ZAM	•	•	•
Zimbabwe	ZIM	•	•	•
Other entries	Code	10	14	18
Independent Olympic Athletes[^]	IOA			
Mixed team[^]	ZZX			
Total		204	203	206

== See also ==
- List of participating nations at the Winter Youth Olympic Games
