= Tuvalu at the 2016 Summer Olympics =

- IOC code: TUV
- NOC: Tuvalu Association of Sports and National Olympic Committee
- Website: www.oceaniasport.com/tuvalu

in Rio de Janeiro
- Competitors: 1 in 1 sport
- Flag bearer: Etimoni Timuani
- Medals: Gold 0 Silver 0 Bronze 0 Total 0

Summer Olympics appearances (overview)
- 2008; 2012; 2016; 2020; 2024

Tuvalu competed at the 2016 Summer Olympics in Rio de Janeiro, Brazil, from 5 to 21 August 2016. The country's participation at Rio de Janeiro marked its third consecutive appearance at the Summer Olympics since its debut in 2008. The delegation included a single track and field athlete: sprinter Etimoni Timuani. Etimoni was also the nation's flagbearer in the Parade of Nations. He did not progress past the first round of his men's 100 metres competition.

== Background ==
Tuvalu participated in three Summer Olympics between its debut in the 2008 Summer Olympics in Beijing, China and the 2016 Summer Olympics in Rio de Janeiro, Brazil. This was the fewest competitors Tuvalu has ever sent, and the only delegate to send one competitor in these Olympics. Tuvalu has sent 3 competitors in their other two appearances. No Tuvaluan has ever won a medal at the Olympics. As he was the only competitor, Etimoni was the one to bear the flag. He qualified via a universality slot from the International Association of Athletics Federations.

== Athletics ==
Tuvalu has received a universality slot from IAAF to send a male athlete to the Olympics. Former footballer turned sprinter Etimoni Timuani made his debut at the Games. However, he has also previously participated in the 2015 Pacific Games in Papua New Guinea and the 2015 World Championships in Athletics in Beijing. Before the event, Tuvalu's assistant secretary of the Ministry of Education Tufoua Panapa said "we're one of the smallest countries. He just makes us bigger than that," and that "he makes us proud." Panapo also said "it's just a great motivation for the younger ones." Timuani finished 7th in his heat with a time of 11.81 seconds, failing to qualify for the semifinals.

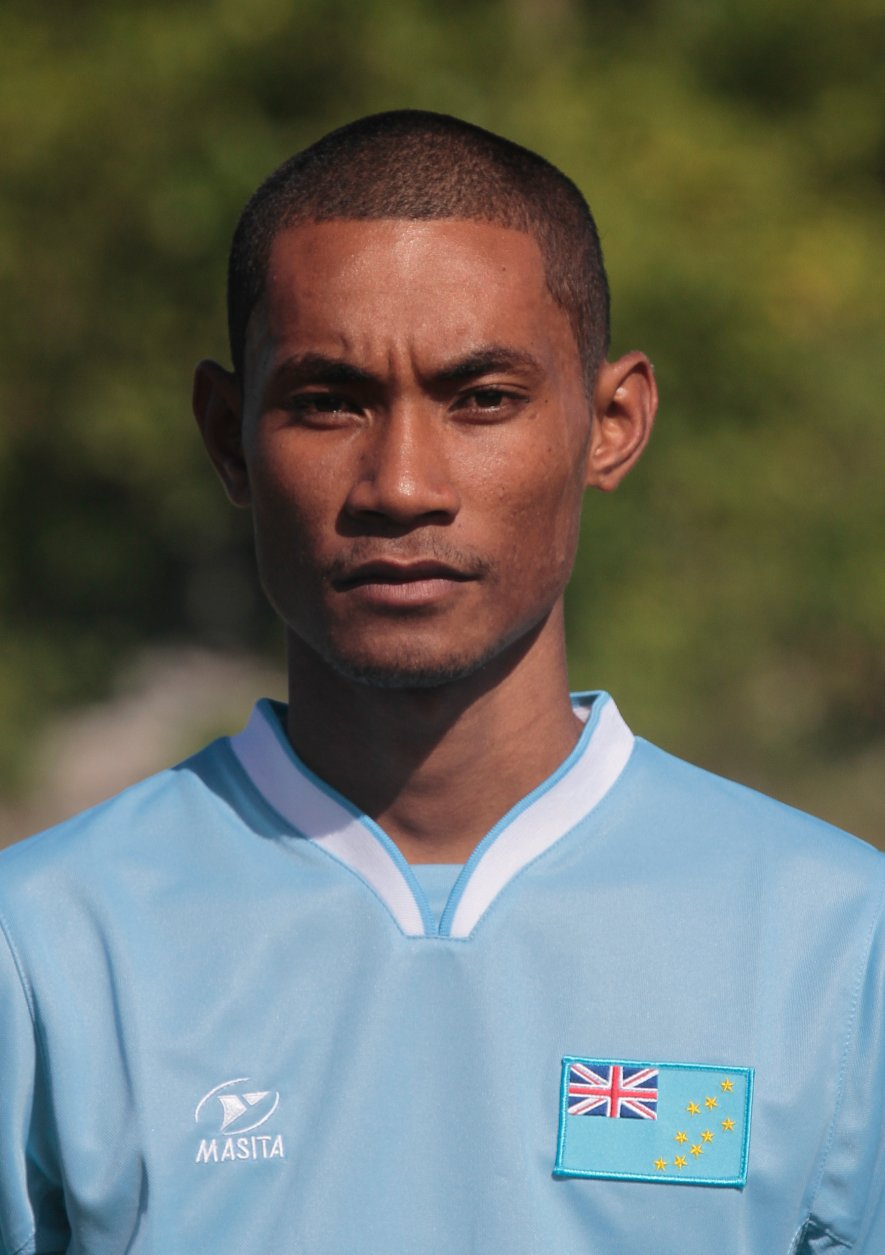
Etimoni Timuani competed in the men's 100 m as the single athlete from Tuvalu, the only NOC to send one athlete to the 2016 Games.

Key

- Note–Ranks given for track events are within the athlete's heat only
- Q = Qualified for the next round
- q = Qualified for the next round as a fastest loser or, in field events, by position without achieving the qualifying target
- NR = National record
- N/A = Round not applicable for the event
- Bye = Athlete not required to compete in round

Track & road events

| Athlete | Event | Heat | | Quarterfinal | | Semifinal | | Final | |
| Athlete | Event | Time | Rank | Time | Rank | Time | Rank | Time | Rank |
|---|---|---|---|---|---|---|---|---|---|
| Etimoni Timuani | Men's 100 m | 11.81 | 7 | Did not advance | | | | | |
