= Tuvalu Association of Sports and National Olympic Committee =

National Olympic Committee

- Country: Tuvalu
- Code: TUV
- Created: 2007
- Recognized: 2007
- Continental Association: ONOC
- Headquarters: Vaiaku, Funafuti
- President: Mika Elisaia
- Secretary General: Elu Tataua

The Tuvalu Association of Sports and National Olympic Committee (TASNOC; IOC Code: TUV) is the Tuvaluan organization recognised as a National Olympic Committee (NOC) by the International Olympic Committee (IOC). In 2006, Tuvalu satisfied the IOC's criterion of a minimum five national sports federations recognised by their international sports federations, which included basketball, volleyball, weightlifting, boxing and table tennis.

TASNOC is a signatory to the World Anti-Doping Code published by the World Anti-Doping Agency.

== History ==
TASNOC came into existence when the Tuvalu Amateur Sport Association or Tuvalu Association of Sports (TAS) was recognized as the Tuvalu National Olympic Committee on 16 July 2007. Robert Laupula managed the Tuvalu Sports Association and the application for membership of the Olympic movement, which was co-ordinated by the Oceania National Olympic Committees.

Geoffrey Ludbrook, who represented Tuvalu at the 2006 Commonwealth Games in Melbourne in the men's 50m Rifle Prone event, worked with the Oceania Shooting Federation so that the Tuvalu Shooting Association obtained full membership of the International Shooting Sport Federation (ISSF) in 2007.

In 2013, Tuvalu was granted Associate status in the Oceania Continent Handball Federation by the International Handball Federation.

== Facilities and management ==
Tuvalu has one sporting field close to the airport. Athletes also train on the airport tarmac, the beach, or on a road. TASNOC's Secretary General said the following about the biggest challenges the committee faces: "I think it's finance and facilities, sporting facilities."

The athletes do not have access to nutritionists, physiotherapists, and sports psychologists. They talk with the pastors of the church for guidance.

In 2007, the Secretary General of the Tuvalu National Olympic Committee was Nakibae Kitiseni. The Secretary General in 2012 was Teake Esene Manatu, who was succeeded by Isala T. Isala on April 3, 2014. Elu Tataua became Secretary General in 2019. The Secretary General is responsible for the logistics of the Tuvalu Games, as well as the logistics when athletes participate in regional and international competitions. They are also in charge of talent acquisition and recruiting.

Kausea Natano was TASNOC's President in 2007. Ampelosa Tehulu, from the Tuvalu Basketball Sports Federation, was elected President of TASNOC on 5 March 2015. Eselealofa Apinelu was the immediate past President. Iakopo Molotii was elected President of TASNOC on September 9, 2016. Mika Elisaia was elected President on 16 October 2019.

The annual budget of TASNOC is 10,000 Australian dollars.

== Events ==
=== Olympics ===
Tuvalu participates in the Olympic Games in the Summer Olympics and have not competed at the Winter Games. Tuvalu entered the Olympic Games for the first time at the 2008 Summer Games in Beijing, China, with a weightlifter and two athletes in the men's and women's 100-metre sprints. A team with athletes in the same events represented Tuvalu at the 2012 Summer Olympics, in London, United Kingdom.

Etimoni Timuani represented Tuvalu at 2016 Summer Olympics in the 100 metre event. Tuvalu was the only country to send one competitor to the 2016 Summer Olympics.

Tuvalu was represented in athletic events at the 2020 Summer Olympics by Karalo Maibuca in the men’s 100 metres, and Matie Stanley in the women’s 100 metres. Tuvalu was represented in athletic events at the 2024 Summer Olympics by Karalo Maibuca in the men’s 100 metres, and Temalini Manatoa in the women's 100 metres.

=== Pacific Games ===
TASNOC organizes Tuvalu's participation in the Pacific Games, and they have participated in six Games. The association is responsible for training the athletes and preparation for the Games. Tuvalu arrived at the 2015 Pacific Games two hours before the Opening Ceremony due to a cyclone that affected the team's travel. They earned their first ever gold medal at the games when Telupe Iosefa won the powerlifting competition.

== Tuvalu Commonwealth Games Association ==
TASNOC is also responsible for organising Tuvalu's participation in the Commonwealth Games and the Commonwealth Youth Games. Tuvalu joined the Commonwealth Games Federation and first participated in the Commonwealth Games in 1998, when a weightlifter attended the games held at Kuala Lumpur, Malaysia. Tuvalu has subsequently sent teams to compete in every Commonwealth Games since 2002. They have participated in table tennis, athletics, shooting, weightlifting, boxing and beach volleyball.

== Affiliations ==
- Tuvalu Athletics Association (TAA)
- Oceania National Olympic Committees
- Commonwealth Games Federation

== See also ==
- Tuvalu at the Olympics
- Tuvalu at the Commonwealth Games
- Tuvalu at the Pacific Games
- Tuvaluan records in athletics
