= Tuvalu at the 2008 Summer Olympics =

- IOC code: TUV
- NOC: Tuvalu Association of Sports and National Olympic Committee
- Website: www.oceaniasport.com/tuvalu

in Beijing
- Competitors: 3 in 2 sports
- Flag bearer: Logona Esau
- Medals: Gold 0 Silver 0 Bronze 0 Total 0

Summer Olympics appearances (overview)
- 2008; 2012; 2016; 2020; 2024; 2028

Tuvalu competed at the 2008 Summer Olympics in Beijing, China, from 8 to 24 August 2008. This was the nation's first ever appearance in an Olympic Game. The delegation included two track and field athletes and one weightlifter. Okilani Tinilau and Asenate Manoa participated in athletics while Logona Esau participated in the weightlifting sport. Both track and field athletes achieved national records. Logona Esau led the Tuvaluan squad as the nation's flag bearer in the parade of nations.

== Background ==
The nation of Tuvalu is a Polynesian island nation, formerly known as the Ellice Islands, located in the Pacific Ocean midway between Hawaii and Australia. A former colony of Great Britain, the island nation became fully independent within The Commonwealth in 1978. The nation had a population of 11,992 as of 2008. Tuvalu's international participation in sports has been limited, however weightlifter Logona Esau won the nation's first international competition medal during the Pacific Mini Games in 2005, when he won the bronze. He was later awarded a silver medal at the 2007 Pacific Games.

The Tuvalu Association of Sports and National Olympic Committee was formed in 2004, and gained International Olympic Committee recognition in 2007 during the IOC's meetings in Guatemala City. The nine small islands that constitute Tuvalu own its own sports infrastructure. However, the nation has eleven active federations of national sports. Included in federation are the following Olympic sports: badminton, basketball, volleyball, weightlifting, tennis and table tennis. The admittance of Tuvalu, along with Montenegro (who participated as Serbia and Montenegro at the 2004 Summer Olympics) and Marshall Islands brought the total number of nations competing in the 2008 Olympics to 205.

The members of the Tuvaluan team at the 2008 Summer Olympics in Beijing were Logona Esau and two competitors in the woman's and men's 100 metre sprint. The two runners were Asenate Manoa, who also was the nation's first female Olympian, and Okilani Tinilau. Both runners trained in Suva, Fiji alongside members of the Fiji national team.

== Athletics ==
Asenate "Nancy" Manoa competed for Tuvalu in the Beijing Olympics as part of the women's 100 metres races. Born in Fiji, Manoa was 16 years old when she first competed in Beijing; she had not previously competed at any Olympic Games. Manoa previously trained on Funafuti International Airport's runway until continuing her training in Fiji; her competition in Beijing marked both her Olympic début and the first time she ever used starting blocks or competed on a synthetic track. During the August 15 qualification round, Manoa competed in the second heat against seven other athletes. She finished the event in 14.05 seconds, placing last in the event; Manoa was directly behind Pakistan's Sadaf Siddiqui (12.41 seconds) and Iraq's Dana Abdulrazak (12.36 seconds) in a heat led by France's Christine Arron (11.37 seconds) and the American runner Lauryn Williams (11.38 seconds). Of the 85 competitors, Asenate Manoa ranked 83rd. She did not advance to later rounds. Both her and Tinilau qualified for the event via universality placement.

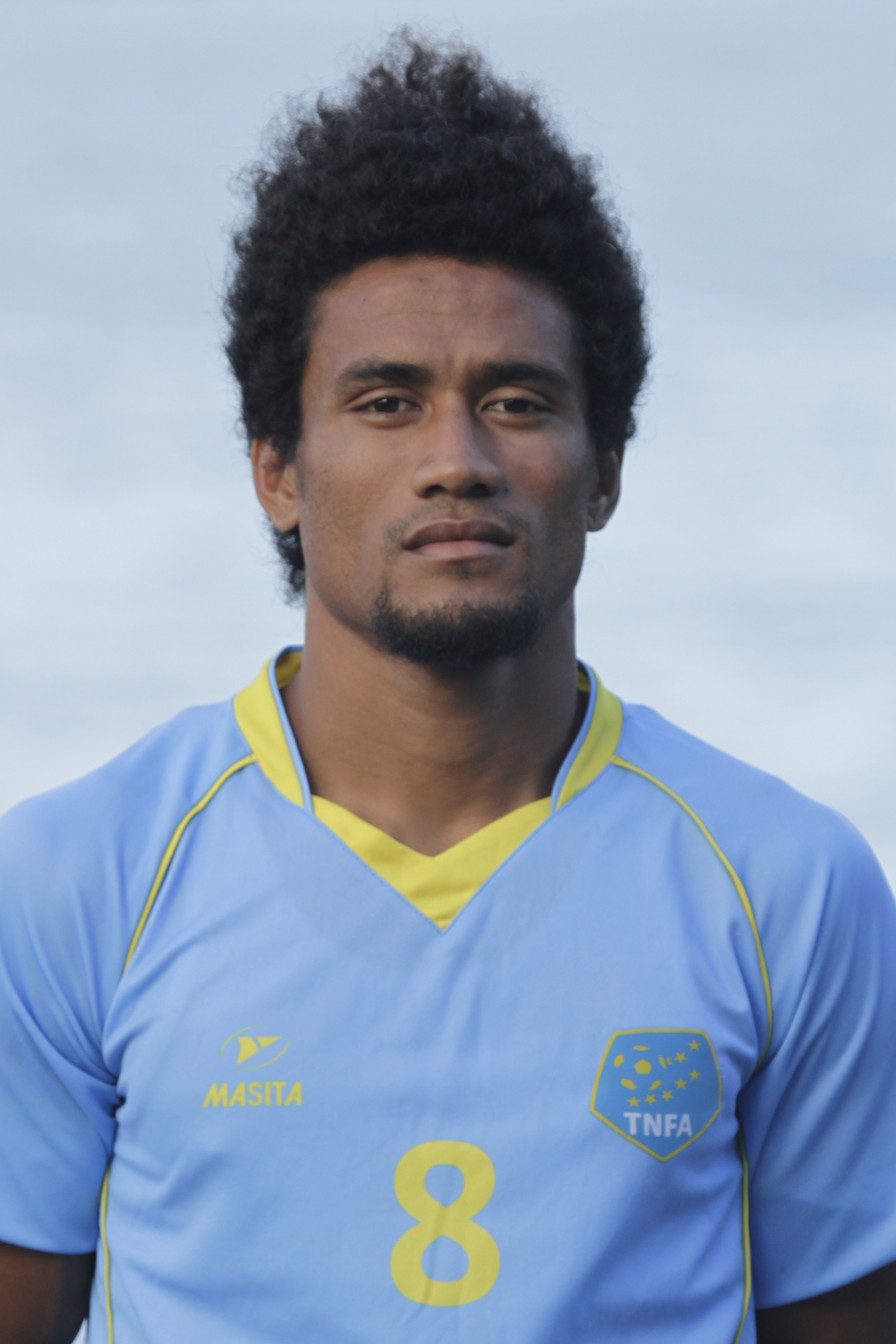
Okilani Tinilau represented Tuvalu in the men's 100 meters.

Okilani Tinilau was the only male athlete from Tuvalu who competed in a track and field event, representing the country in the men's 100 metres races at the Beijing Olympics. He was born in January 1989, and was 19 years old at the time of the 2008 Summer Olympics. Tinilau had not previously competed at any Olympic Games. During the course of the races, which took place during August 14, Tinilau competed in the tenth heat against seven other athletes. He finished the race in 11.48 seconds, placing last in the event. he was directly behind Chad's Moumi Sébergué (11.14 seconds), who placed seventh; and Gabon's Wilfried Bingangoye (10.87 seconds), who placed sixth. The heat itself was led by Dutch Antilean athlete Churandy Martina (10.35 seconds) and Japanese runner Naoki Tsukahara (10.39 seconds). Of the 80 competitors in the event, Tinilau ranked 77th and did not advance to later rounds.

Key

- Note–Ranks given for track events are within the athlete's heat only
- Q = Qualified for the next round
- q = Qualified for the next round as a fastest loser or, in field events, by position without achieving the qualifying target
- NR = National record
- N/A = Round not applicable for the event
- Bye = Athlete not required to compete in round

Men

Athlete	Event	Heat		Quarterfinal		Semifinal		Final	
Athlete	Event	Result	Rank	Result	Rank	Result	Rank	Result	Rank
Okilani Tinilau	100 m	11.48 NR	8	Did not advance					

Women

Athlete	Event	Heat		Quarterfinal		Semifinal		Final	
Athlete	Event	Result	Rank	Result	Rank	Result	Rank	Result	Rank
Asenate Manoa	100 m	14.05 NR	8	Did not advance					

== Weightlifting ==
Logona Esau qualified for weightlifting via an invitation from the Tripartite commission. He represented Tuvalu as its first weightlifter, and its only competitor in the sport at the Beijing Games. He competed in the lightweight class. Born in the South Pacific island nation of Nauru in 1987, Esau was 21 years old at the time of his participation in his Beijing event. He was the most experienced and decorated of the three Tuvaluan athletes who came to Beijing's Olympic Games, having previously medaled in Oceanian international competitions. Logona Esau's event, which took place on August 12, included 30 athletes. He and New Zealand's Mark Spooner were the only competitors from Oceania in that particular competition. All of Esau's snatches were successful, and he lifted 102 kilograms, 107 kilograms, and 110 kilograms successively. During the clean and jerks, Esau successfully lifted 138 kilograms, then 144 kilograms. He unsuccessfully attempted to lift 148 kilograms. His total score, a combination of his highest snatch and clean and jerk lifts, was 254 kilograms. This ranked the Tuvaluan in 23rd place out of the 24 athletes who finished the event. Tajikistan scored below Tuvalu at 250 kilograms and Nepal scored immediately above at 268 kilograms. In comparison, Liao Hui of China won the gold medal after lifting a combined 348 kilograms.

Athlete	Event	Snatch		Clean & Jerk		Total	Rank
Athlete	Event	Result	Rank	Result	Rank	Total	Rank
Logona Esau	Men's −69 kg	110	29	144	23	254	23
