= Tuvalu at the 2012 Summer Olympics =

- IOC code: TUV
- NOC: Tuvalu Association of Sports and National Olympic Committee
- Website: www.oceaniasport.com/tuvalu

in London
- Competitors: 3 in 2 sports
- Flag bearer (opening): Tuau Lapua Lapua
- Flag bearer (closing): Asenate Manoa
- Medals: Gold 0 Silver 0 Bronze 0 Total 0

Summer Olympics appearances (overview)
- 2008; 2012; 2016; 2020; 2024; 2028

Tuvalu competed at the 2012 Summer Olympics in London, which was held from 27 July to 12 August 2012. The country's participation at London marked its second appearance in the Summer Olympics since its debut at the 2008 Summer Olympics. The delegation consisted of three competitors: two short-distance runners, Tavevele Noa and Asenate Manoa, and one weightlifter, Tuau Lapua Lapua. All three qualified for the games through wildcard places because they did not meet the qualification standards. Lapua was the flag bearer for the opening ceremony while Manoa carried it at the closing ceremony. Noa and Manoa failed to advance beyond the preliminary rounds of their events although the latter established a new national record for the women's 100 metres, while Lapua placed 12th in the men's featherweight (62 kilogram) weightlifting competition.

== Background ==
The 2012 Summer Olympics in London, United Kingdom are Tuvalu's second Summer Olympics following its debut at the 2008 Summer Olympics in Beijing, China. No Tuvaluan athlete had ever won a medal at the Olympic Games. The delegation consisted of sprinters Tavevele Noa and Asenate Manoa and weightlifter Tuau Lapua Lapua. The team trained with the sports coaching faculty at the University of Central Lancashire and with the Preston Harriers Athletics Club in the 100-day period before the Games. Lapua was selected as the flag bearer for the opening ceremony while Manoa carried it at the closing ceremony.

== Competitors ==
The following is the list of number of competitors participating in the Games and selected biographies.

Sport	Men	Women	Total
Athletics	1	1	2
Weightlifting	1	0	1
Total	2	1	3

== Athletics ==
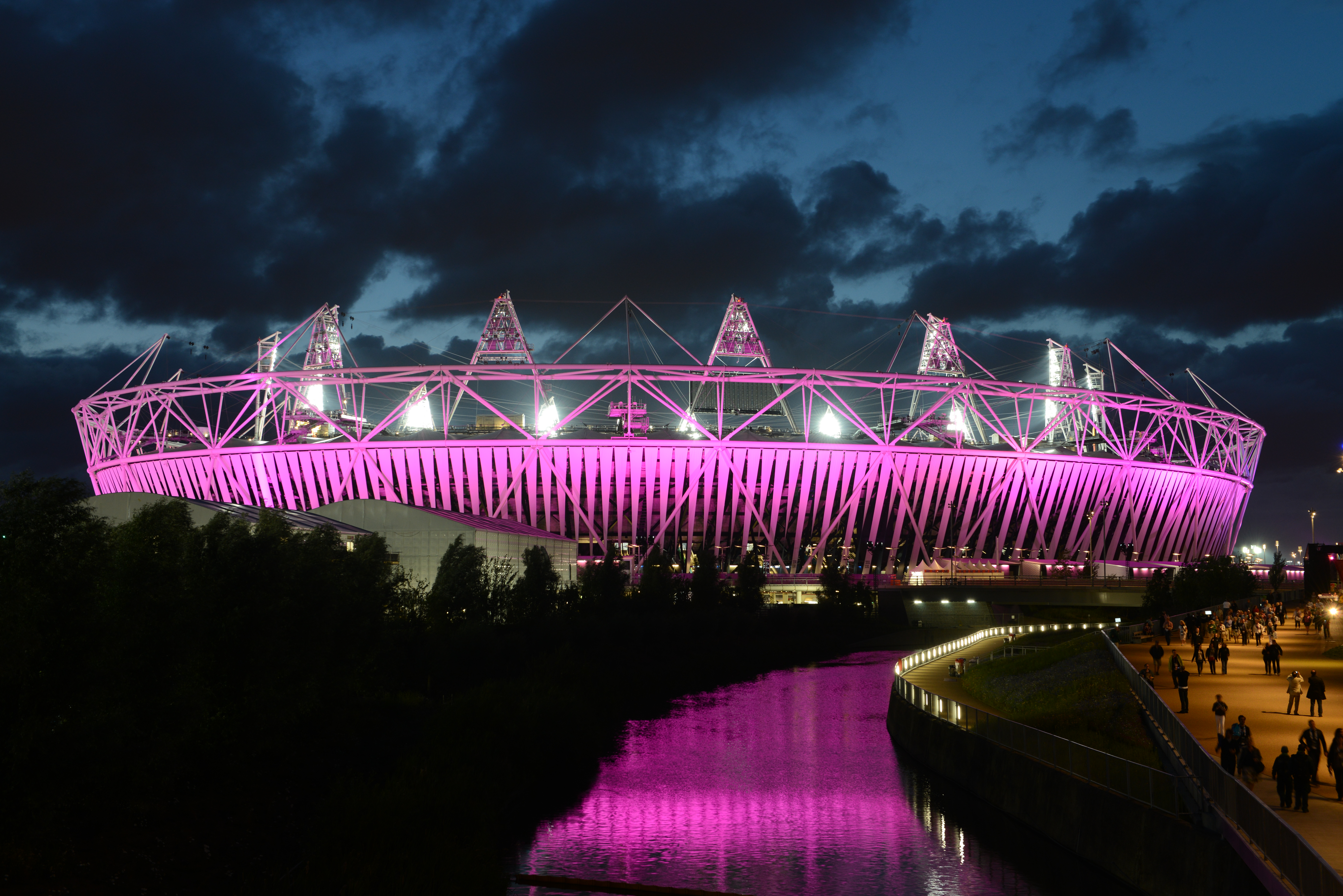
The London Olympic Stadium, where Noa and Manoa competed in athletics events

Tavevele Noa was the sole male athletic competitor to compete for Tuvalu at the London Olympics at the age of 20. He had not taken part in any previous Olympic Games. Noa qualified for the Games by using a wildcard after competing in an event on Tuvalu's main island and was selected to take part in the men's 100 metres dash. In an interview before the Games he said he was looking to competing in the Olympics and felt nervous but aimed to establish a new personal best time. Noa was drawn in the second heat of the preliminary round on 4 August, finishing sixth out of seven runners, with a time of 11.55 seconds. He finished 72nd out of 76 overall and did not advance to the later stages after being ¾ of a second slower than the slowest athlete in his heat who progressed. After his event he stated: "My race was not good, my aim was to get 10 seconds. The start of my race was good but then when I reached 60 meters, I let it down."

At the age of 20 years and 73 days, Asenate Manoa was the youngest athlete to represent Tuvalu at the London Games. She had previously participated in the 2008 Summer Olympics in Beijing. Manoa qualified for the Games by using a wildcard because her fastest time of 13.82 seconds, recorded on 21 June 2011 in Apia, Samoa, was 2.44 seconds slower than the "B" qualifying standard for her event, the women's 100 metres sprint. In an interview with The Daily Telegraph before the Games she said she had been nervous taking part in Beijing but was looking forward to participating in London. Manoa was drawn in the second heat of the preliminary round, finishing seventh out of eight runners, with a time of 13.48 seconds. Her time established a new Tuvaluan national record in the displicine. He finished 73rd overall out of 78 competitors, (Note: One athlete, Noor Hussain Al-Malki, did not finish.) and was unable to progress into the first round after finishing 1.48 seconds slower than the slowest athlete in her heat who made the later stages. She was pleased with her performance, saying that she felt she could run quicker: "I know what I need to work on, in order for me to go faster and get another National Record. I hope everyone in Tuvalu is proud of me."

=== Key ===
- Note–Ranks given for track events are within the athlete's heat only
- NR = National record

=== Men ===
Athlete	Event	Heat		Quarterfinal		Semifinal		Final	
Athlete	Event	Result	Rank	Result	Rank	Result	Rank	Result	Rank
Tavevele Noa	100 m	11.55	6	Did not advance					

=== Women ===
Athlete	Event	Heat		Quarterfinal		Semifinal		Final	
Athlete	Event	Result	Rank	Result	Rank	Result	Rank	Result	Rank
Asenate Manoa	100 m	13.48 NR	7	Did not advance					

== Weightlifting ==
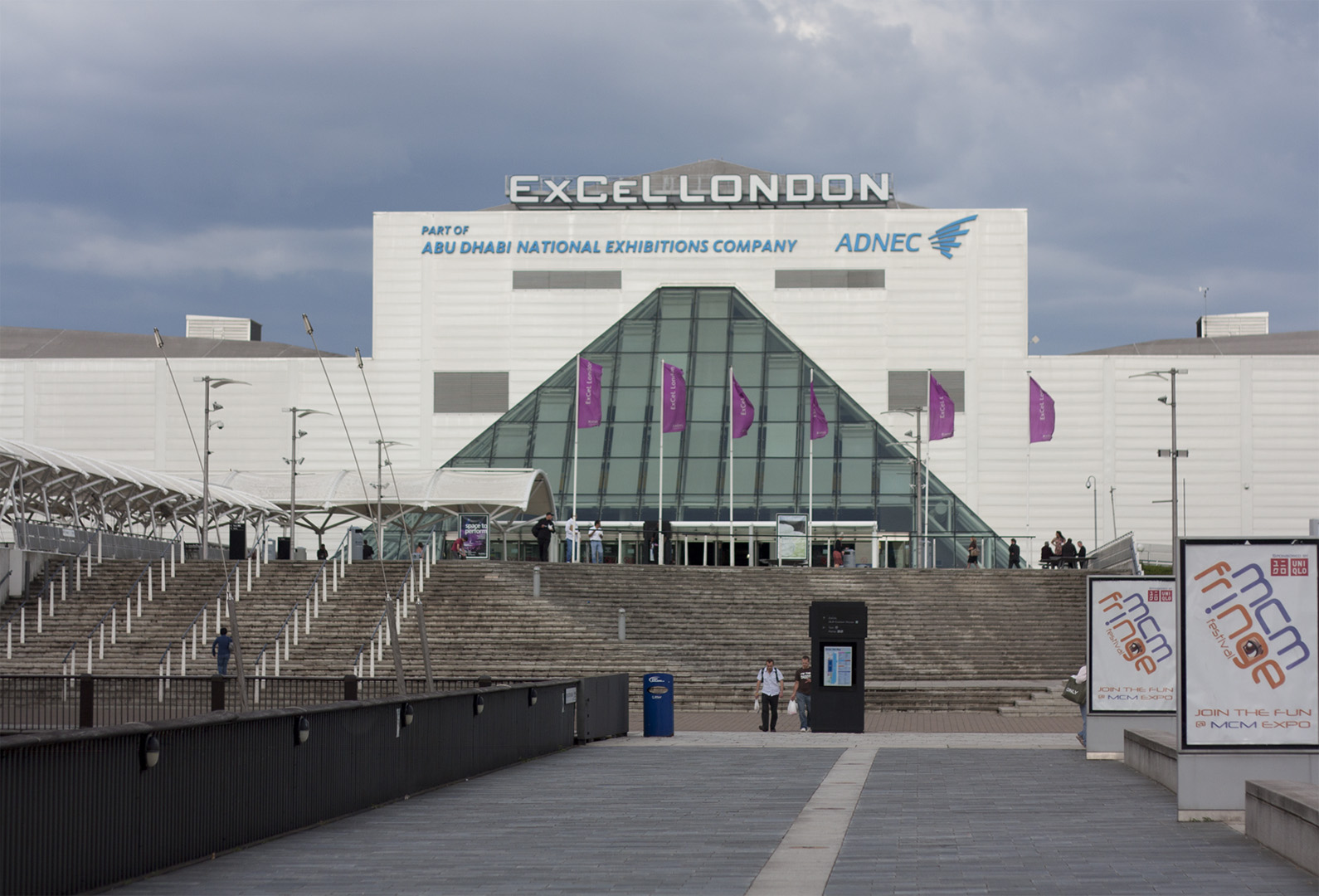
ExCeL London where Lapau competed in his weightlifting event.

Tuau Lapua Lapua participated on Tuvalu's behalf in the men's featherweight (62 kilogram) weightlifting competition. He was the oldest person to represent Tuvalu at age 21 and had not participated in any previous Olympic Games. Lapua qualified for the games by earning a wildcard place based on his performance at the 2012 Oceania Weightlifting Championships in Apia, Samoa. Before his event he said that he was delighted to compete in the competition and wanted to make Tuvalu proud. His event took place in 31 July, and included 14 athletes in total. During the event's snatch phase, Lapua was given three attempts. He successfully attempted to lift over 90 kilograms of weight in his first two attempts, but did not achieve this objective on the third attempt. Lapua then attempted 130 kilograms during the clean and jerk phrase of the event, successfully lifting it in all three of his attempts. Overall, the combination of Lapua's highest scores in snatch (108) and clean and jerk (135) yielded a score of 243 points and 12th place. (Note: One weightlifter, Ji Hun-Min, did not finish.)

Athlete	Event	Snatch		Clean & Jerk		Total	Rank
Athlete	Event	Result	Rank	Result	Rank	Total	Rank
Tuau Lapua Lapua	Men's −62 kg	108	13	135	12	243	12

== See also ==
- Tuvaluan records in athletics
- Tuvalu at the Olympics
