= Temalini Manatoa =

Tuvaluan sprinter (born 2004)

Personal information
- Nationality: Tuvalu
- Born: 21 April 2004 (age 22)

Sport
- Country: Tuvalu
- Sport: Athletics
- Event: 100 m

Achievements and titles
- Personal best: 14.04s (100 m)

Temalini Manatoa (born 21 April 2004) is a Tuvaluan sprinter. She represented Tuvalu in the women's 100 metres event at the 2024 Summer Olympics. She ran a personal best time of 14.04 seconds during the preliminary round, she placed eighth in her heat and did not progress further in the event.
