= Okilani Tinilau =

Tuvaluan sprinter and footballer

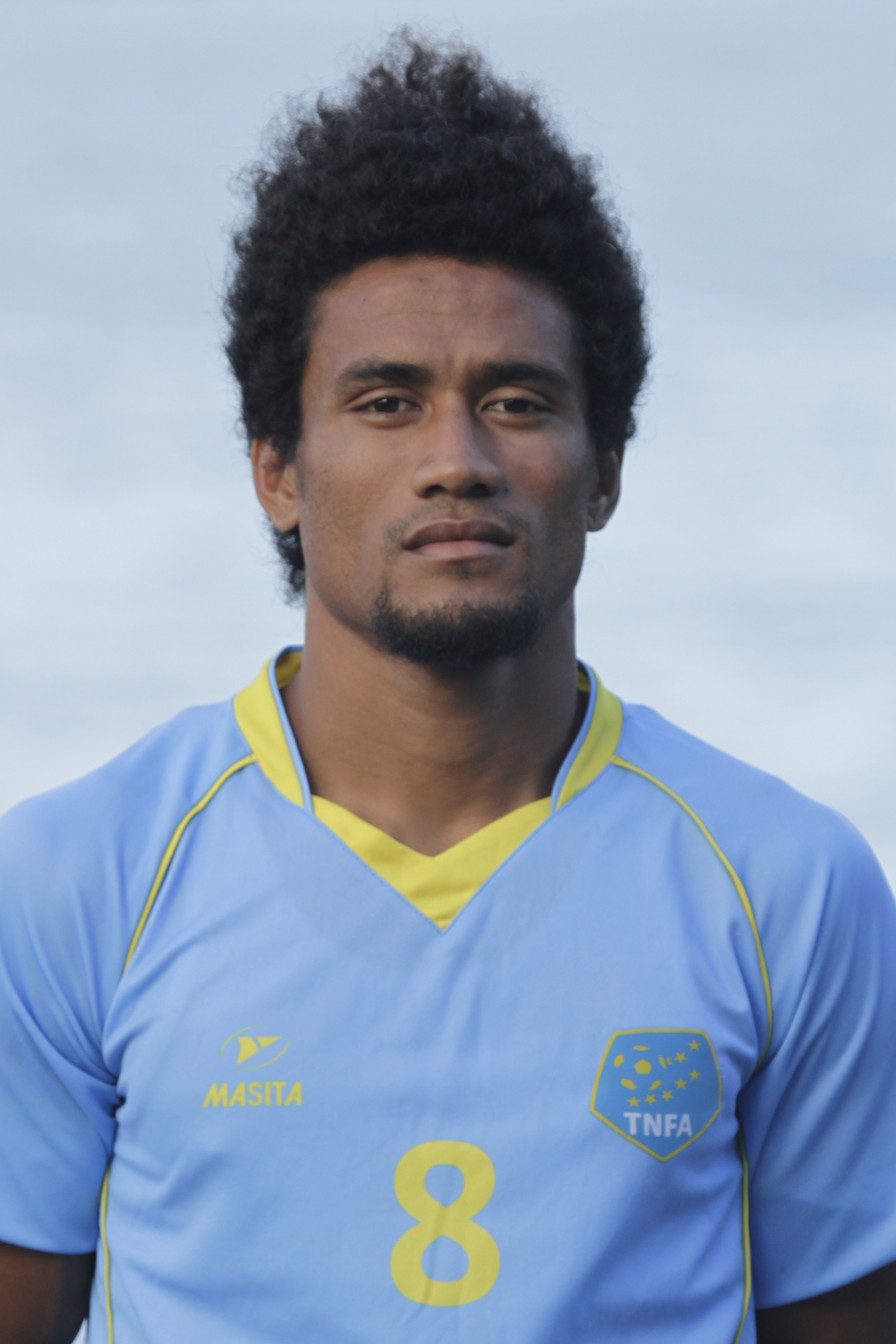
- Tinilau with the Tuvalu national football team

Personal information
- Born: 2 January 1989 (age 37) Nukulaelae, Tuvalu
- Height: 1.78 m (5 ft 10 in)
Association football career
- Position: Midfielder
Team information
- Current team: FC Manu Laeva
- Number: 8
Senior career*
Years	Team	Apps	(Gls)
2006-	FC Manu Laeva		(7)
International career
2006-2011	Tuvalu	3	(0)
- * Club domestic league appearances and goals

Sport
- Sport: Athletics (2007- ),

Achievements and titles
- Personal best: 100m: 11.44 (2011)
Medal record
Men's athletics
Representing Tuvalu
Oceania Championships
Bronze medal – third place	2011 Apia	Long jump
Bronze medal – third place	2011 Apia	Triple jump
- Updated on 25 April 2013

Okilani Tinilau (born 2 January 1989) is a Tuvaluan footballer and sprinter who represented Tuvalu at the 2008 Summer Olympics. As a footballer, Tinilau plays for F.C. Manu Laeva in the Tuvalu A-Division, also playing on the Tuvalu national football team.

== Football ==
=== Club career ===
He plays for FC Manu Laeva football club in Tuvalu. At the 2012 NBT Cup, he was the top scorer with 5 goals.

He represented Tuvalu at the 2008 Summer Olympics at the 2008 Summer Olympics in Beijing, during the country's first ever Olympic Games. While competing in the 100 metre sprint, he set a national record with a time of 11.48. His personal best time is 11.44.

Tinilau also participated in the 2009 World Championships in Athletics, (11.57 sec) the 2011 World Championships (11.58 secs) and the 2013 World Championships (11.57 secs).

His personal best in the long jump is 7.02 m.

=== International career ===
Tinilau is also part of the Tuvalu national football team as a midfielder and participated in the 2011 Pacific Games. He made his debut in the match against New Caledonia on 1 September 2011. He also played in the games against Vanuatu; and the Solomon Islands.

No.	Date	Venue	Opponent	Score	Result	Competition
1	9 June 2018	Bedfont Recreation Ground, Bedfont, England	Chagos Islands	1–0	6–1	Friendly
2	9 June 2018	Bedfont Recreation Ground, Bedfont, England	Chagos Islands	4–1	6–1	Friendly

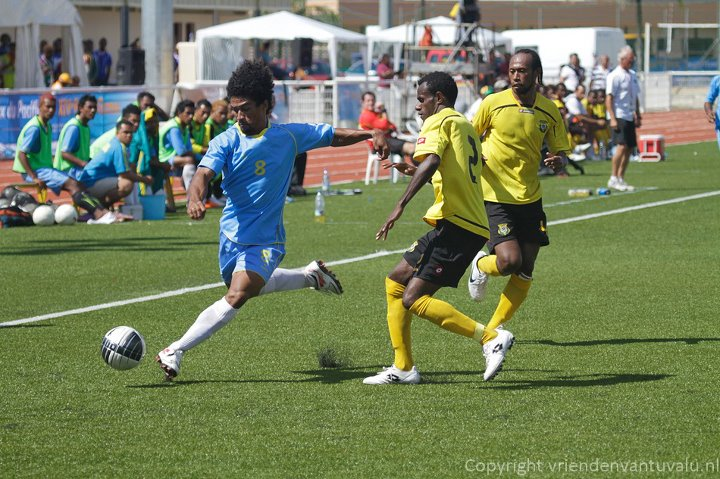
Okilani Tinilau in action against Vanuatu (2011)

=== Honours ===
- NBT Cup Top Scorer: 2012
- Christmas Cup Top Scorer: 2012

== Athletics ==
=== Track events ===
Event	Performance	Date	Place
200 m	23.73 s (nat. rec.)	6 August 2009	Gold Coast, Australia
100 m	11.44.11 s (+1.2 m/s) (nat. rec.)	21 June 2011	Oceania Regional Championships, Apia, Samoa

=== Field events ===
Year	Competition	Venue	Position	Event	Notes
Representing Tuvalu
2011	Oceania Championships (Regional Division East)	Apia, Samoa	3rd	Long jump	7.02 m (wind: -0.6 m/s)
2011	Oceania Championships (Regional Division East)	Apia, Samoa	3rd	Triple jump	13.61 m (wind: +1.8 m/s)
