= Asenate Manoa =

Tuvaluan sprinter

Personal information
- Born: 23 May 1992 (age 34) Kioa, Fiji

Sport
- Country: Tuvalu
- Sport: Athletics
- Events: 100 metres Triple jump Powerlifting

Achievements and titles
- Personal best: 100m - 13.48s
Medal record
Women's Powerlifting
Representing Tuvalu
Pacific Games
Bronze medal – third place	2015 Port Moresby	-72kg
Women's Athletics
Representing Tuvalu
Pacific Mini Games
Bronze medal – third place	2009 Rarotonga	Triple jump
- Updated on 17 July 2022

Asenate Manoa (born 23 May 1992) is a Tuvaluan track and field athlete who represented Tuvalu at the 2008 Summer Olympics, at the 2009 World Championships & 2011 World Championships and at the 2012 Summer Olympics. Manoa represented Tuvalu in the sport of powerlifting at the Pacific Games 2015 and won a bronze medal in the 72 kg Female category. She was the first woman to represent Tuvalu at the Olympics.

Manoa was born on Kioa island in Fiji.

== Beijing Olympics, 2008 ==
Asenate "Nancy" Manoa competed for Tuvalu as its first female Olympian, competing in the Beijing Olympics as part of the women's 100 meters races. Manoa was 16 years old when she first competed in Beijing. After initially training on the runway of Funafuti International Airport, Manoa trained in Suva, Fiji in preparation for the games. She was mentored by members of Fiji's track team, and worked at the offices of the regional Olympic administrator, ONOC. She had never used starting blocks or run on a synthetic track before arriving in Beijing. Slight of figure, she weighs 101 lbs (46 kg).

She competed in the 100m sprint. Her time of 14.05 secs. was the slowest in her heat, but was a Tuvaluan national record.

The Guardian described her as "impossibly tiny for an international sprinter", and noted that, in the Beijing National Stadium, she was "running in front of an audience 10 times the size of her country's population".

== 2009 World Championships in Athletics ==
She competed in the 100 metres at the 2009 World Championships, with a time of 13.75 secs. in the preliminary heat.

== 2011 World Championships in Athletics ==
She competed in the 100 metres at the 2011 World Championships, with a time of 13.92 secs. in the preliminary heat.

== London Olympics, 2012 ==
She trained in Brisbane, Australia, in her preparation for the 2012 Summer Olympics in London. In the Women's 100 metres, she took her national record to 13.48 secs.

== Pacific Games 2015 ==
Manoa took up powerlifting. She had success at the Pacific Games 2015 in her category: 72 kg Female - TOTAL 340 kg - bronze medal.

== 2017 Pacific Mini Games ==
Manoa participated in the women’s long jump event at the 2017 Pacific Mini Games; finishing 11th in the event with a jump of 4.60 m.
