= Karalo Maibuca =

Tuvaluan sprinter

Personal information
- Born: 10 June 1999 (age 27) Nanumanga, Tuvalu
- Height: 1.76 m (5 ft 9 in)

Sport
- Sport: Track and field
- Event: Sprints

Achievements and titles
- Personal bests: 11.35s (100 m); 23.66s (200 m)

Karalo Hepoiteloto Maibuca Junior (born 10 June 1999) at Nanumanga, Tuvalu is a sprinter. He is the son of Ratu Karalo Maibuca Senior, a Fijian, and a mother from Kioa. He was selected to compete at the 2020 Summer Olympics and was given the honour of being the flag bearer for his nation in the opening ceremony alongside Matie Stanley. In the preliminary round of the 100m he ran a Tuvaluan national record time of 11.42 seconds, but did not qualify to the next round.

Maibuca participated in the World Athletics Championships in 2022 & 2023.

Maibuca represented Tuvalu at the Gold Coast XXI Commonwealth Games in 2018 and the Birmingham XXII Commonwealth Games in 2022, where he broke the Tuvalu national record in the 100m with a time of 11.39 [+0.6]. Maibuca competed in the 2023 World Athletics Championships in Budapest, running 11.55 [0.0] in the 100 metres, but failed to progress past the preliminary round.

Maibuca represented Tuvalu at the Pacific Mini Games in Saipan in 2023 where he competed in the 100m (11.76 [-2.0]) and the 200m (23.66 .

Maibuca represented Tuvalu in the 2023 Pacific Games:

- In the preliminary heat of the 100 metres, he placed 6th with a time of 11.76 seconds [-2.0], but not proceed in the competition.
- In the preliminary heat of the 200 metres, he placed 4th with a time of 23.31 seconds; in the semifinal he placed 7th with a time of 23.66 seconds [-0.9], but not proceed in the competition.
- He also ran in the 4 x 100 metre relay with Kanae Saloa Malua, Londoni Tiso and Kaumoana Teaitala. In the preliminary heat the team placed 3rd with a time of 43.56 seconds; in the final the team placed 6th with a time of 43.29 seconds.

He competed in the 100 metres at the 2024 Paris Olympics.
