= Etimoni Timuani =

Tuvuluan footballer and sprinter

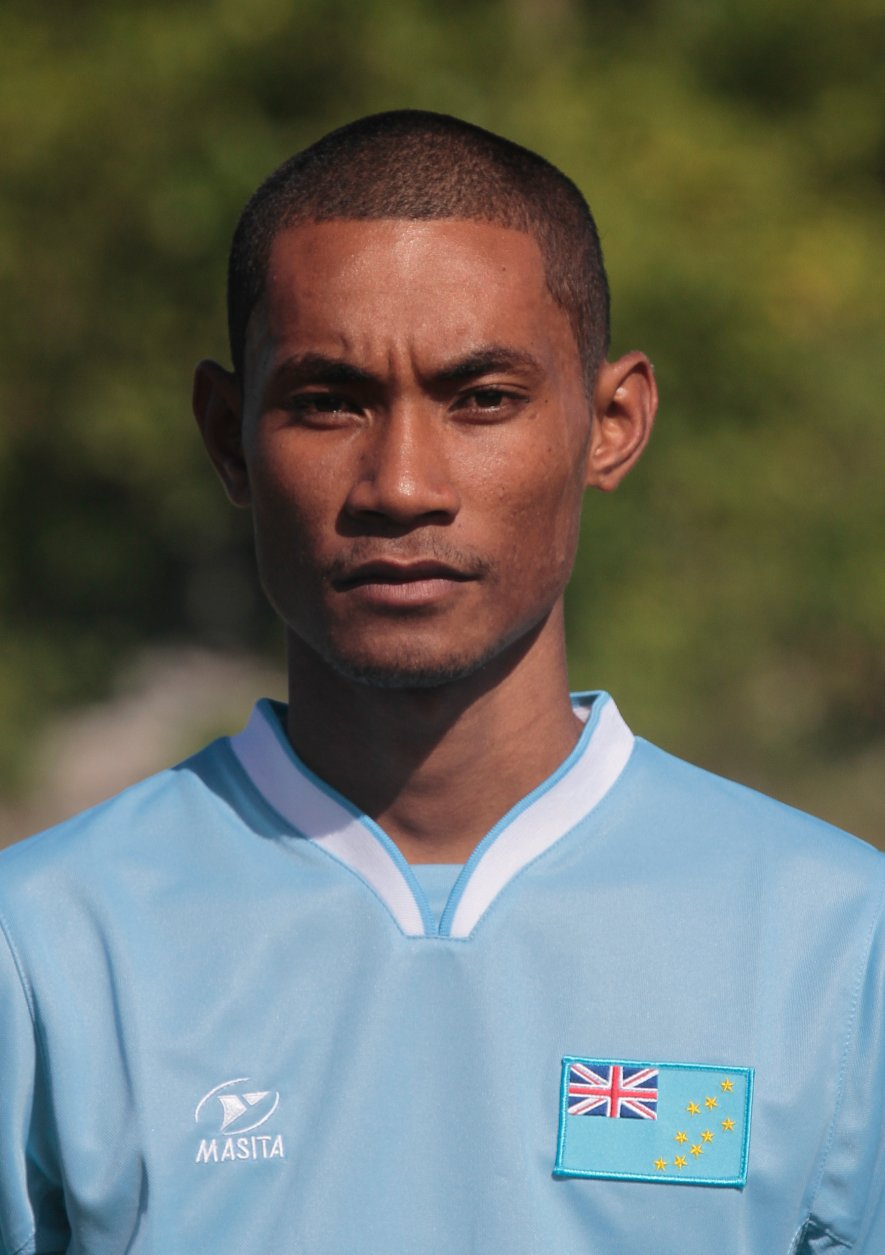
- Timuani with Tuvalu in 2011

Personal information
- Date of birth: 14 October 1991 (age 35)
- Place of birth: Funafuti, Tuvalu
- Height: 1.84 m (6 ft 0 in)
- Position: Defender

Team information
- Current team: Tofaga

Senior career*
Years	Team	Apps	(Gls)
2008–	Tofaga		
2011	→ Lakena United (loan)		
2012	→ Tofaga B		

International career^{‡}
2011	Tuvalu (futsal)	4	(0)
2011–2018	Tuvalu	9	(1)
- * Club domestic league appearances and goals ‡ National team caps and goals as of June 2018

Etimoni Timuani (born 14 October 1991 in Funafuti) is a Tuvaluan sportsman. He is a footballer and sprinter specializing in the 100 m distance. Timuani is a father-of-two from Funafuti who works for the Tuvalu National Provident Fund, the national pension scheme.

== Club career ==
Timuani played in 2011 for Lakena United. In 2012, he played for Tofaga. In 2014, he played for Manu Laeva. Timuani was the top goalscorer in the NBT Cup for B teams in 2012, with 8 goals.

The 2013 Tuvalu Games football champions were Tofaga. They won the final against Nauti 1–0, with him scoring the only goal.

== International career ==
=== Futsal ===
Timuani played in May 2011 with Tuvalu national futsal team at the Oceanian Futsal Championship. He played all four games.

=== Football ===
He made his debut for the Tuvalu national football team in the game against Samoa on 22 August 2011. He played five games for the Tuvalu national football team at the 2011 Pacific Games as a defender: against American Samoa, Vanuatu, New Caledonia, Solomon Islands, and Guam.

No.	Date	Venue	Opponent	Score	Result	Competition
1	3 June 2018	Coles Park, Haringey, England	Matabeleland	1–1	1–3	2018 CONIFA World Football Cup

=== Athletics ===
Etimoni Timuani
Personal information
- Height: 184 cm (6 ft 0 in)
- Weight: 72 kg (159 lb)

Sport
- Sport: Track and field
- Event: 100 m

Achievements and titles
- Personal best: 11.72 (2015)
- Updated on 29 August 2015

Reme represented Tuvalu in Athletics at the 2015 Pacific Games in Papua New Guinea. He was however disqualified in the 100 m heats due to a false start. He competed in the Men's 100 metres event at the 2015 World Championships in Athletics in Beijing, China with a time of 11.72 seconds in the preliminary heat. He qualified for the 2016 Rio Olympics in the 100 m event. He was the only Tuvaluan to represent Tuvalu in the Rio Olympics. He achieved a time of 11.81 seconds in the preliminary heat. He did not advance to the next round.

== Honours ==
- NBT Cup for B teams Top Scorer: 2012

== See also ==
- Tuvalu at the 2015 World Championships in Athletics
- Tuvalu at the 2016 Summer Olympics
