= List of Tuvaluan records in athletics =

The following are the national records in athletics in Tuvalu maintained by its national athletics federation: Tuvalu Athletics Association.

== Outdoor ==
Key to tables: Awaiting ratification Record not kept by Tuvalu Athletics Association

=== Men ===
| Event | Record | Athlete | Date | Meet | Place | Ref. |
|---|---|---|---|---|---|---|
| 100 m | 11.42 (+1.2 m/s) | Karalo Maibuca | 31 July 2021 | Olympic Games | Tokyo, Japan | |
| 100 m | 11.4 h | Okilani Tinilau | 26 July 2005 | | Tarawa, Kiribati | |
| 100 m | 11.39 (+0.6 m/s) | Karalo Maibuca | 2 August 2022 | Commonwealth Games | Birmingham, United Kingdom | |
| 100 m | 11.30 (+0.6 m/s) | Karalo Maibuca | 3 August 2024 | Olympic Games | Paris, France | |
| 200 m | 23.08 (+0.7 m/s) | Kanaee Saloa Tauia | 6 August 2009 | Polynesian Regional Championships | Gold Coast, Queensland, Australia | |
| 200 m | 23.08 (−0.9 m/s) | Kanaee Saloa Tauia | 17 July 2019 | | Apia, Samoa | |
| 400 m | 54.81 | Telava Folitau | 6 August 2009 | Polynesian Regional Championships | Gold Coast, Queensland, Australia | |
| 800 m | 2:12.0 | Nelu Auega | July 1971 | | Meneñ, Nauru | |
| 1500 m | 4:12.7 | Filemu | 2011 | | Tuvalu | |
| 3000 m | 11:49.19 | Lapua Tuau | 28 November 2005 | | Melbourne, Australia | |
| 5000 m | | | | | | |
| 10,000 m | | | | | | |
| Marathon | | | | | | |
| 110 m hurdles | | | | | | |
| 400 m hurdles | | | | | | |
| 3000 m steeplechase | | | | | | |
| High jump | 1.90 m | Kaitu Kaitu | 21 August 2018 | | Suva, Fiji | |
| Pole vault | | | | | | |
| Long jump | 7.02 m (−0.6 m/s) | Okilani Tinilau | 23 June 2011 | Oceania Regional Championships | Apia, Samoa | |
| Triple jump | 13.61 m (−1.1 m/s) | Okilani Tinilau | 22 June 2011 | Oceania Regional Championships | Apia, Samoa | |
| Shot put | 13.55 m | Fakapelu Sileti | 2011 | | Funafuti, Tuvalu | |
| Discus throw | 36.12 m | Fakapelu Sileti | 2011 | | Funafuti, Tuvalu | |
| Hammer throw | | | | | | |
| Javelin throw | 53.62 m | Imo Fiamalua | 11 December 2017 | Pacific Mini Games | Port Vila, Vanuatu | |
| Decathlon | | | | | | |
| Decathlon | 100m / Long jump / Shot put / High jump / 400m / 110m H / Discus / Pole vault / Javelin / 1500m | | | | | |
| 20 km walk (road) | | | | | | |
| 50 km walk (road) | | | | | | |
| 4 × 100 m relay | 46.07 | Tuvalu; Tupou Koliano; Vaiuli Nukualofa; Meauma Petaia; Karalo Maibuca | 13 December 2017 | Pacific Mini Games | Port Vila, Vanuatu | |
| 4 × 400 m relay | 4:08.3 (Note: 4:11.7 by other sources) | | 8 April 2011 | | Vaitupu, Tuvalu | |

=== Women ===
| Event | Record | Athlete | Date | Meet | Place | Ref. |
|---|---|---|---|---|---|---|
| 100 m | 13.48 (−0.2 m/s) | Asenate Manoa | 3 August 2012 | Olympic Games | London, United Kingdom | |
| 200 m | 28.75 (−1.1 m/s) | Asenate Manoa | 25 September 2009 | Pacific Mini Games | Nikao, Cook Islands | |
| 400 m | 1:11.71 | Asenate Manoa | 4 September 2013 | Pacific Mini Games | Mata-Utu, Wallis and Futuna | |
| 400 m | 1:01.8 h | Lapuam Tuau | | | | |
| 800 m | 2:43.4 | Milineta Lepeni | 8 July 2005 | | Suva, Fiji | |
| 1500 m | 6:14.8^{†} | Eleni Taulealea | 13 September 1971 | South Pacific Games | Pirae, French Polynesia | |
| 3000 m | 15:32.2 | Florida Jiro | 8 April 2011 | | Vaitupu, Tuvalu | |
| 5000 m | | | | | | |
| 10,000 m | | | | | | |
| Marathon | | | | | | |
| 100 m hurdles | | | | | | |
| 400 m hurdles | | | | | | |
| 3000 m steeplechase | | | | | | |
| High jump | 1.485 m | Tepua (Note: Tofi by World Athletics source) | 2011 | | Funafuti, Tuvalu | |
| High jump | 1.485 m | Fanaufou (Note: Tofi by World Athletics source) | 2011 | | Funafuti, Tuvalu | |
| High jump | 1.485 m | Tofi | 2011 | | Funafuti, Tuvalu | |
| Pole vault | | | | | | |
| Long jump | 4.99 m (−0.1 m/s) | Asenate Manoa | 4 September 2013 | Pacific Mini Games | Mata-Utu, Wallis and Futuna | |
| Triple jump | 10.29 m (+1.0 m/s) | Asenate Manoa | 25 September 2009 | Pacific Mini Games | Nikao, Cook Islands | |
| Shot put | 10.41 m | Inara Sione | 2012 | | Funafuti, Tuvalu | |
| Discus throw | 26.71 m | Moliga Sioni | 30 June 2012 | | Funafuti, Tuvalu | |
| Hammer throw | | | | | | |
| Javelin throw | 31.66 m | Inara Sioni | 23 June 2012 | | Funafuti, Tuvalu | |
| Heptathlon | | | | | | |
| Heptathlon | 100m H / High jump / Shot put / 200m / Long jump / Javelin / 800m | | | | | |
| 20 km walk (road) | | | | | | |
| 4 × 100 m relay | 1:01.0 | Tuvalu; Milineta Lepeni; Fuamalo; Puaita; Futinai | 4 May 2005 | | Funafuti, Tuvalu | |
| 4 × 400 m relay | 5:20.9 | | 8 April 2011 | | Vaitupu, Tuvalu | |

^{†}: the result is not found in the complete result list of the games. Achieved on 4 May 2005 in Funafuti, Tuvalu, by another source.

== Indoor ==
=== Men ===
| Event | Record | Athlete | Date | Meet | Place | Ref. |
|---|---|---|---|---|---|---|
| 60 m | 7.47 | Karalo Maibuca | 3 March 2018 | World Championships | Birmingham, United Kingdom | |
| 60 m | 7.27 | Karalo Maibuca | 1 March 2024 | World Championships | Glasgow, United Kingdom | |
| 200 m | | | | | | |
| 400 m | | | | | | |
| 800 m | | | | | | |
| 1500 m | | | | | | |
| 3000 m | | | | | | |
| 60 m hurdles | | | | | | |
| High jump | | | | | | |
| Pole vault | | | | | | |
| Long jump | | | | | | |
| Triple jump | | | | | | |
| Shot put | | | | | | |
| Heptathlon | | | | | | |
| Heptathlon | 60m / Long jump / Shot put / High jump / 60m H / Pole vault / 1000m | | | | | |
| 5000 m walk | | | | | | |
| 4 × 400 m relay | | | | | | |

=== Women ===
| Event | Record | Athlete | Date | Meet | Place | Ref. |
|---|---|---|---|---|---|---|
| 60 m | 8.69 | Asenate Manoa | 19 September 2017 | Asian Indoor and Martial Arts Games | Ashgabat, Turkmenistan | |
| 200 m | | | | | | |
| 400 m | | | | | | |
| 800 m | | | | | | |
| 1500 m | | | | | | |
| 3000 m | | | | | | |
| 60 m hurdles | | | | | | |
| High jump | | | | | | |
| Pole vault | | | | | | |
| Long jump | | | | | | |
| Triple jump | | | | | | |
| Shot put | | | | | | |
| Pentathlon | | | | | | |
| Pentathlon | 60m H / High jump / Shot put / Long jump / 800m | | | | | |
| 3000 m walk | | | | | | |
| 4 × 400 m relay | | | | | | |
