= Riverdale =

Riverdale may refer to:

== Buildings ==
- Riverdale Centre, former name for Lewisham Shopping Centre, London, England
- Riverdale House, a Victorian mansion in Sheffield, England
- Riverdale (Selma, Alabama), a historic plantation house in Dallas County, Alabama, United States
- Riverdale station, several stations by that name
- Riverdale Village, a mall in Coon Rapids, Minnesota, United States
- Riverdale, the estate of John Lothrop Motley and later Albert W. Nickerson
- Riverdale (Odessa, Delaware), listed on the National Register of Historic Places in New Castle County, Delaware, United States

== Entertainment ==
- Riverdale (Archie Comics), the fictional town in which the Archie Comics are set
  - Riverdale (American TV series), an American television series based on the Archie comic book series that premiered on the CW in 2017
- Riverdale Records, a British record label in the 1970s
- Riverdale (Canadian TV series), a 1997–2000 Canadian primetime soap opera

== Places ==
=== Canada ===
- Riverdale, Edmonton, Alberta
- Riverdale Municipality, Manitoba
- Riverdale, Nova Scotia
- Riverdale, Toronto, Ontario
  - Riverdale (provincial electoral district)
- Riverdale Ward, a former municipal ward of the city of Ottawa, Ontario
- Riverdale, Whitehorse, Yukon

=== United States ===
- Riverdale (Little Rock), Arkansas
- Riverdale, California
- Riverdale, Georgia, a suburb of Atlanta
- Riverdale, Chicago, Illinois
  - Riverdale station (Illinois)
- Riverdale, Illinois
- Riverdale, Iowa
- Riverdale, Kansas
- Riverdale Park, Maryland, originally named Riverdale
- Riverdale, a neighborhood of Gloucester, Massachusetts
- Riverdale, a neighborhood of Dedham, Massachusetts
- Riverdale, Michigan
- Riverdale, Mississippi
- Riverdale, Missouri
- Riverdale, Nebraska
- Riverdale, New Jersey
- Riverdale, Bronx, New York
- Riverdale, North Dakota
- Riverdale, Dayton, Ohio
- Riverdale, Halifax County, Virginia
- Riverdale, Roanoke, Virginia
- Riverdale, Utah
- Riverdale Township (disambiguation)

=== New Zealand ===
- Riverdale, New Zealand, a suburb of Gisborne
- Riverdale, the original name of Bainham in the Tasman District

== Schools ==
- Riverdale High School (disambiguation)
- Riverdale Country School, a private school in the Bronx, New York, United States
- Riverdale Academy (Louisiana), a private school in Red River Parish, United States
- Riverdale Baptist School, a Christian school in Upper Marlboro, Maryland, United States
- Riverdale Collegiate Institute, a high school in Toronto, Ontario, Canada
- Riverdale School, Palmerston North, a primary (elementary) school in New Zealand

== Other uses ==
- Baron Riverdale, a title in the Peerage of the United Kingdom

== See also ==
- Riversdale (disambiguation)
