= Haskell station =

Former railway station in Wanaque, New Jersey, US

Haskell
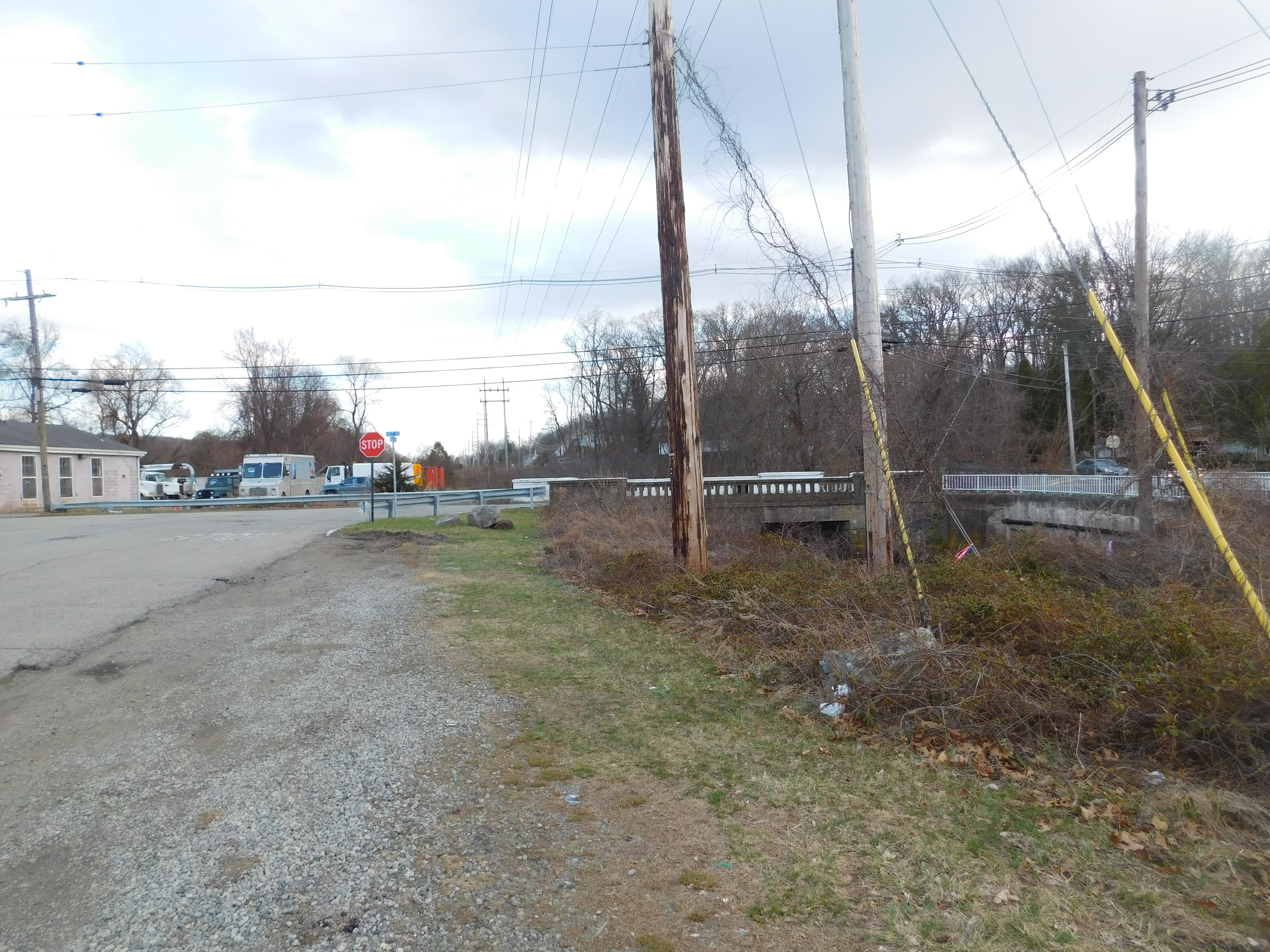
- The site of Haskell station in April 2018, facing the former Doty Road crossing.

General information
- Location: Doty Road at Greenwood Avenue, Haskell, Wanaque, New Jersey 07420
- Coordinates: 41.029221°N 74.298938°W
- Line: New York and Greenwood Lake Railroad
- Platforms: 1 side platform
- Tracks: 2

Other information
- Station code: 1787

History
- Opened: c. 1909
- Closed: September 30, 1966; 60 years ago
- Rebuilt: 1916; 1952
- Electrified: Not electrified

Services
Preceding station	Erie Railroad	Following station
Wanaque–Midvale toward Sterling Forest	New York and Greenwood Lake Railway	Pompton Junction toward Jersey City
Location

Haskell was a former commuter railroad station in the Haskell section of Wanaque, Passaic County, New Jersey, United States. Located at the Doty Road grade crossing in Wanaque, trains operated on the Erie Railroad's New York and Greenwood Lake Railway between Pavonia Terminal in Jersey City and Wanaque–Midvale station. The next station to the north was Wanaque–Midvale while the next station to the south from c. 1909–1930 was Pompton Junction. Afterwards, the next stop was Pompton–Riverdale. Haskell station consisted of a single low-level side platform and a three-sided shelter for protection.

Rail service in Haskell began on January 1, 1873 with the introduction of the Montclair Railway between Pavonia Terminal and Monks station in West Milford. However, Haskell was not an original station, with the two stops in Wanaque being at the crossing of modern County Route 511 known as Wanaque and the station in Midvale. With the establishment of a workers community for the DuPont smokeless powder plant in Wanaque, rail service began operating a stop known as Haskell c. 1909. In 1913, after some political wrangling, the Erie were forced to build a proper station depot, which came in 1916. Just 34 years later, fighting began between Wanaque and the railroad about demolishing the depot, resulting in a fight between August 1950 and March 1952, when the sides agreed to a deal. The railroad replaced the stucco station depot with a three-sided station shelter from Harrison. Service ended on September 30, 1966.

== Station layout and services ==
Outbound	← Greenwood Lake Division weekdays toward Wanaque–Midvale (Wanaque–Midvale)
Inbound	Greenwood Lake Division weekdays toward Hoboken (Pompton–Riverdale) →
Side platform, station shelter (Note: The termini of Wanaque–Midvale and Hoboken Terminal recognize the destinations at the end of passenger service on June 30, 1966.)

At the time of the ending of service through Haskell, the station operated with six trains on the mixed alignment of the Greenwood Lake–Boonton Line of the Erie Lackawanna Railway. Two trains operated weekdays eastbound, stopping at Haskell at 6:41 a.m. and 7:15 a.m. Two buses also operated on the line, stopping at 5:49 a.m. and 7:40 a.m. Customers would use the buses to catch a train at Mountain View. For trains bound for Wanaque–Midvale station, four stopped at Haskell: 4:34 p.m., 5:54 p.m., 6:37 p.m. and 7:19 p.m. A substitute bus arrived at 7:48 p.m.

== History ==
The beginning of railroad service in the Wanaque River valley began on January 1, 1873 with the opening of the Montclair Railway, a line between Jersey City's Pavonia Terminal and the Monks section of West Milford. At the time of opening, two stations opened in the section of Pompton Township that make up modern-day Wanaque. The first one was located at the crossing of modern-day County Route 511 (CR 511), known as Wanaque. The second was at Midvale.

However, what led to the construction of a station at Doty Road was the establishment of the American Smokeless Powder Works in 1894, which bought a local electric plant in Wanaque. The new gunpowder production company became property of Laflin and Rand, another powder mill, in 1898 after American Smokeless went into foreclosure. The DuPont company took over, when they purchased the property outright in December 1903. The plant created a worker community for staff. This development had houses for 450 families, along with dormitories and clubhouses for 250 women and 800 men. The community, named Haskell, also contained a gymnasium, a YMCA and hospital. The first station at Haskell for the railroad was in place by 1909.

=== Station depot construction (1913–1916) ===
On April 11, 1913, a group of twenty residents of Haskell appeared before the Public Utility Commission in Newark to request that the Commission help get the Erie Railroad to build a proper station at Haskell for their use. Led by Charles Dabbs, the manager of the DuPont plant at Haskell, their demands felt that the station, consisting of a three-sided shelter shed with no agent for freight or passenger service. All freight services were handled at Pompton Junction station, Dabbs stated that the lack of services were hurting the growth of the community. At the hearing, the railroad stated that there are not enough trains to justify a full depot and agent at Haskell, with trains only stopping to service those at the DuPont powder mill. With Pompton Junction and the Midvale stations, both just over 1 mile (1.6 km) away, having agents, there would be no reason to staff someone at Haskell. At the end of the April 11, 1913 hearing, the Public Utilities Commissioners requested that the railroad come up with a plan for an enclosed station with heating for the winter months.

The railroad complied on April 25, sending a report noting their proposed additions to the shed. The Commissioners would send it to the Haskell residents and their counsel on June 13 with the note that if they did not object, the matter would be considered closed and approved. However, Martin Drew, representing the Haskell residents, informed them that the requested a further hearing, which would be held on July 18.

The final hearings of the Commissioners on the proposal were held on July 18. The Erie Railroad proposed a 24 by 10 feet (7.3 m × 3.0 m) wooden frame station in addition to the pre-existing shelter shed. Edmund Stalter, an attorney, objected to the proposal by the railroad, stated that this proposed design would not be adequate for Haskell service. Stalter stated that the shelter shed was in such disrepair it needed to be destroyed and be replaced with a full-size depot. After the hearing, the case was reserved for later decision.

The Public Utilities Commissioners announced their decision on September 22, stating that the proposal by the railroad was adequate for making the railroad happy and that the railroad must build the new station addition by November 1, 1913. The announcement was made public on September 26, stating that the residents would not get a new station agent.

However, the citizens of Haskell would not get a new station until 1916, when the railroad built a stucco irregular design depot for the station.

=== Station depot squabbles (1950–1952) ===
==== Proposals and hearings (1950–1951) ====
The Erie Railroad informed Wanaque in October 1950 of its desire to raze the station depot and discontinue the agent at Haskell. As part of the proposal, the station storage shed would be converted into a passenger shelter for commuters. Wanaque Mayor Anthony Guide and one of his councilmen, Thomas Evangelista immediately declared their opposition, obtaining opposition signatures from residents. The pair of politicians also urged their constituents to write the Public Utilities Commission in Newark to voice their opposition to the proposal. Mitchel Donato, the borough attorney, would attend the October 11 hearing about the decision, representing the municipality. Donato also had the endorsement of Nicholas Martini, the Passaic County counsel, to help in the legal fight. Martini's endorsement stated that they felt the railroad was taking a "backward step".

However, the Public Utilities Commission postponed the October 11 hearing on the request of Grover Cleveland James, the Erie's chief legal counsel. James' request was that he needed extra time to find witnesses to support his side of the argument. Donato did not object to the motion and the hearing was moved to November 16.

The November 16 hearing became heated between Donato and James. James' argument to the Public Utilities Commission was that the station and agent were unnecessary because of the low amount of revenue the station was bringing the railroad. Donato responded that the new housing development in the Haskell area, made up of 500 new homes, had increased usage of Haskell station. Donato also charged James that the railroad was not doing its job in supervising the station, meaning most tickets were bought on board the train rather at the station when the agent, Vincent Ike, was off his work hours. After the squabbling, James requested an adjournment and was granted a delay until December 7. The approval of the adjournment was for James to check the testimony of opposition that the agent and his wife were not doing their jobs on a regular basis.

At the December 7 hearing, George Crom Jr., a passenger agent, testified that the elimination would only inconvenience the eight listed passengers who bought their commutation tickets at the depot. He stated the rest of the riders bought their tickets on the train. After the hearing, the Public Utilities Commission put the decision into conference for a later decision.

In January 1951, the Public Utilities Commission gave the Erie Railroad permission to raze the passenger and freight depots, on the condition that the freight station was partially kept for a commuter shelter. This proposal would cost the railroad $1,500 (1951 USD).

In July, Evangelista, now Mayor of Wanaque, made a formal recommendation for opposition against the Erie's newest attempt to eliminate the depots at Haskell. This time the railroad proposed eliminating the freight service available at Haskell by moving the depot entirely from the property. Any freight deliveries would require using the Wanaque–Midvale station. The council would inform the railroad of its decision.

The major fight in the Haskell depot debate came in September 1951 when the Public Utilities Commission would start holding hearings again on the subject. On September 23, Wanaque Borough Council announced that they would have Donato attend a new hearing on October 17 to continue their efforts in stopping the railroad. Evangelista backed up his previous arguments about the new homes and factories in the area and the inconvenience it would bring to passengers while Councilman James Gaul felt that the borough would lose the fight.

On October 3, the Passaic County Board of Freeholders passed a resolution that formalized their dissent about the discontinuation of the freight house at Haskell. The Board forwarded their resolution to the Public Utility Commissioners.

At the October 17 hearing, the railroad explained that the request from January was too expensive for them to undertake. Their preference was to demolish the entire building and replace it with a three-sided shelter from Harrison. Hortense Kessler, in charge of the hearings, asked that the railroad and the municipality both provide the Public Utilities Commissioners their figures for station ridership and adjourned the meeting until October 25.

During the October 25 meeting, the municipality and railroad both provided figures for the Commission. James stated that on October 19 73 people boarded trains at Haskell while 87 disembarked; on October 23, 60 embarked and 72 departed trains at Haskell. Donato stated that 63 passengers boarded eight trains on October 24 between 4:43 a.m. and 9:18 a.m., counted by Wanaque police.

Kessler requested that the two parties (the railroad and municipality) sit down and negotiate a deal rather than continue hearings on the subject. She stated that they would hold another hearing when written reports of conferencing were sent to her office. Wanaque Borough Council came up with a proposal that evening on what to offer the railroad in a deal. As part of this deal, the municipality would allow demolition of the depot on the conditions that the passenger shelter be enclosed with electric lighting; that the parking area at Haskell be improved and a barrier built to protect the station from the parking lot; and that drainage be improved at the station. The proposed deal would also eliminate requests for the shelter to have sanitary facilities and heating. However, the railroad wanted to stick with its original plan, a 20 by 8 feet (6.1 m × 2.4 m) shelter with three sides from Harrison. The Borough Council reaffirmed its plan on December 12, officially making the offer to the railroad. Donato also explained their proposed conditions, noting that a drainage ditch would need to be moved from the railroad crossing at Doty Road; re-grading the parking lot and beautifying the station.

==== Deal struck (1952) ====
The railroad and the Wanaque Borough Council struck a deal on March 5, 1952. Erie Railroad engineer Lewis Swope helped facilitate negotiations. As part of the deal, the station depots, a former warehouse and outhouse would be razed and replaced by the shelter. Swope agreed to the requests from Wanaque of re-grading the parking lot and providing a barrier fence.

However, no deal was struck at that point for the questions of drainage. Haskell station had been subject to flooding because of poor drainage. Swope stated that the drainage ditch being redirected would have nothing to do with the station demolition. The ditch in question ran along the tracks and falling onto Ringwood Avenue (CR 511), causing flooding near a restaurant. The Borough Council wanted the ditch moved to under the tracks to a nearby swamp. Swope stated that the proposal would result in changing the water alignment and open the railroad to liability issues, along with the high expense for such a move. Wanaque Borough Council passed a resolution to design a plan for eliminating the drainage issue that would be forwarded to the Erie at a later date.

A local resident asked if the Erie could eliminate a 4-foot (1.2 m) dip on Storms Avenue that the tracks were causing for cars, including shattering window issues. James Gaul also asked that the railroad work on a noise issue from idling trains at the local roundhouse in Midvale. The clerk would be authorized to send a letter to the Erie on both issues.

The Public Utility Commission approved the deal struck between the two parties in August 1952. Donato stated that he would write the railroad to go ahead with permission to begin construction.

=== Decline and closure (1960–1966) ===
The Erie Railroad merged with the Delaware, Lackawanna and Western Railroad on October 17, 1960, forming the Erie Lackawanna Railway. Two years later, as part of service changes to eliminate the former Erie Railroad tracks in downtown Passaic, an agreement was made to merge the Erie's Greenwood Lake Division (Hoboken Terminal to Wanaque–Midvale) and the Lackawanna's Boonton Branch (Hoboken to Washington). Service between Mountain View in Wayne to Wanaque–Midvale would become a shuttle service. In July, the railroad announced that there would be more service between Wanaque–Midvale and Mountain View as part of the service, which came into effect on September 27, 1963.

As part of several service eliminations, the shuttle between Wanaque–Midvale and Mountain View ended on September 30, 1966. Martin Munson, a Wanaque resident and Erie Lackawanna engineer, operated the final train, marking the closure of service in Haskell.

== Bibliography ==
- Board of Public Utility Commissioners (1915). Reports of the Board of Public Utility Commissioners of the State of New Jersey: Volume II: June 9, 1913 to May 12, 1914. Union Hill, New Jersey: Dispatch Printing Company.
- Catlin, George L. (1873). Homes on the Montclair Railway, for New York Business Men. A Description of the Country Adjacent to the Montclair Railway, Between Jersey City and Greenwood Lake. New York, New York: Montclair Railway Company.
- Williams, William Bradford (1920). History of the Manufacture of Explosives for the World War, 1917-1918. United States Ordinance Department.
- United States Congress (1962). Hearings Before a Subcommittee of the Committee on Banking and Currency; United States Senate Eighty-Seventh Congress Second Session on Bills to Authorize the Housing and Home Finance Agency to Provide Additional Assistance for the Development of Mass Transportation Systems and for Other Purposes. Washington D.C.: United States Government Printing Office.
- Yanosey, Robert J. (2006). Erie Railroad Facilities (In Color). Vol. 1: New Jersey. Scotch Plains, New Jersey: Morning Sun Books Inc. ISBN 1582481830.
