= Pompton Plains station =

Former railway station in Morris County, New Jersey, US

Pompton Plains
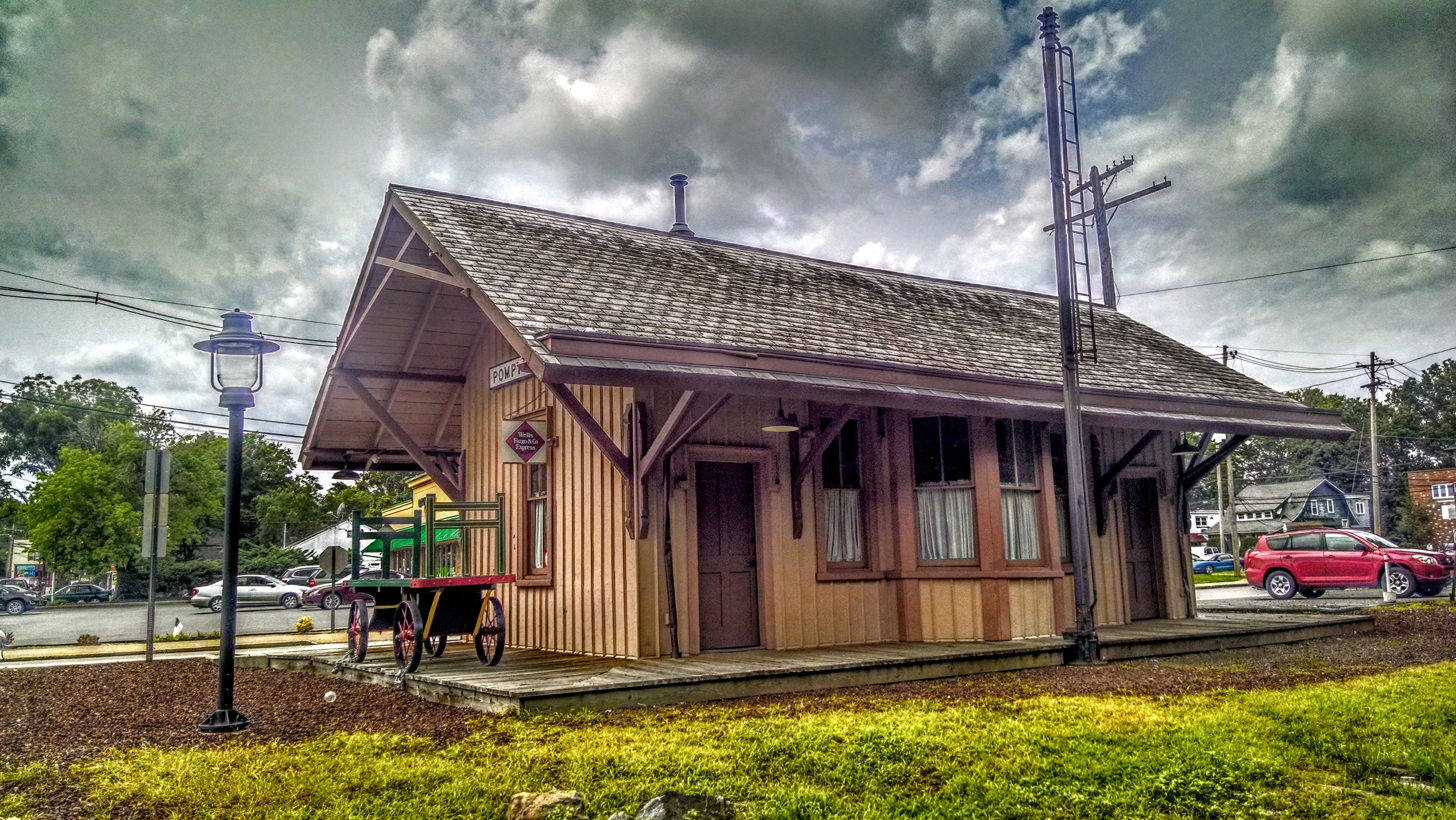
- The Pompton Plains railroad station viewed from the track side in July 2017

General information
- Location: 33 Evans Place, Pequannock Township, New Jersey 07444
- Owner: Montclair Railway (1873–1878); New York and Greenwood Lake Railroad (1878–1943); Erie Railroad (1943–1960); Erie-Lackawanna Railway (1960–1966); Township of Pequannock (2010–present)
- Lines: New York and Greenwood Lake Railway
- Platforms: 1 side platform
- Tracks: 2

Construction
- Platform levels: 1

Other information
- Station code: 1779

History
- Opened: January 1, 1873; 153 years ago
- Closed: September 30, 1966; 59 years ago

Former services
Preceding station	Erie Railroad	Following station
Pompton–Riverdale toward Sterling Forest	New York and Greenwood Lake Railway	Pequannock toward Jersey City
- Pompton Plains Railroad Station
- U.S. National Register of Historic Places
- New Jersey Register of Historic Places
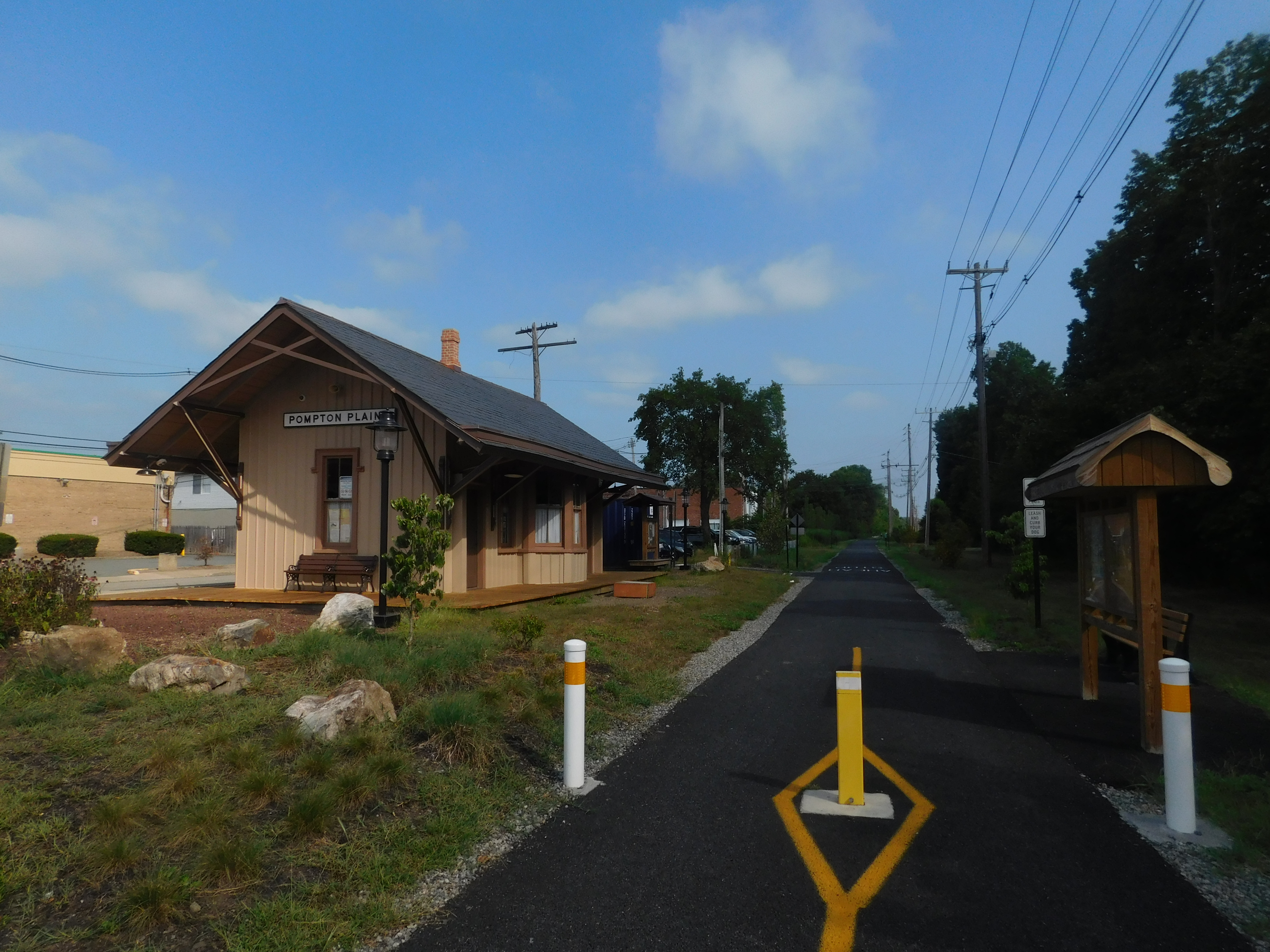
- Pompton Plains station in August 2025

- Location within Morris County, New Jersey Location within New Jersey Location within the United States
- Nearest city: Pequannock Township, New Jersey
- Coordinates: 40.9685698°N 74.2936937°W
- Area: less than one acre
- Built: 1872
- Architectural style: Gothic Revival
- NRHP reference No.: 08000136
- NJRHP No.: 3735

Significant dates
- Added to NRHP: March 5, 2008
- Designated NJRHP: December 19, 2007
Location

Pompton Plains is a former railroad station in Pequannock Township, Morris County, New Jersey, United States. Located at 33 Evans Place in the Pompton Plains section of Pequannock, the station is a former stop on the Erie Railroad's Greenwood Lake Division (former New York and Greenwood Lake Railway). The station was a single side-platform station with service from Wanaque–Midvale station in Wanaque to Pavonia Terminal in Jersey City, where connections were made to ferries to New York City. The next station north was Pompton–Riverdale after 1951 (Riverdale station before 1951). The next station south was Pequannock station.

Service through Pompton Plains began in January 1873 as part of a railroad from Jersey City to Greenwood Lake and Sterling Forest, New York. The station became part of the New York and Greenwood Lake in 1878 and the Erie Railroad in 1896. Service through to Greenwood Lake ended in 1935 and replaced to Wanaque. In October 1963, the station became part of a shuttle line operated by the Erie-Lackawanna Railroad between Wanaque–Midvale and Mountain View station in Wayne. Passenger service at Pompton Plains ended on September 30, 1966 as part of several cuts by the Erie-Lackawanna.

The station was added to the National Register of Historic Places on March 5, 2008.

== History ==
James R. Evans was the station agent from the 1870s to turn of the 20th century. Regular passenger train service for the train station ended in 1963, although shuttles from Mountain View remained until 1966. Freight service to the station continued into the early 1980s.

More recently, the station building was used as a clothing consignment shop, and later as a State Farm insurance office. The station and site were purchased by Pequannock Township in 2005. The station was restored in 2009 and currently serves as the Pequannock Township Museum.

As of 2020, the railroad right-of-way along the station was sold by the owner, New York, Susquehanna and Western Railway and bought by Morris County for redevelopment as a public rail trail.

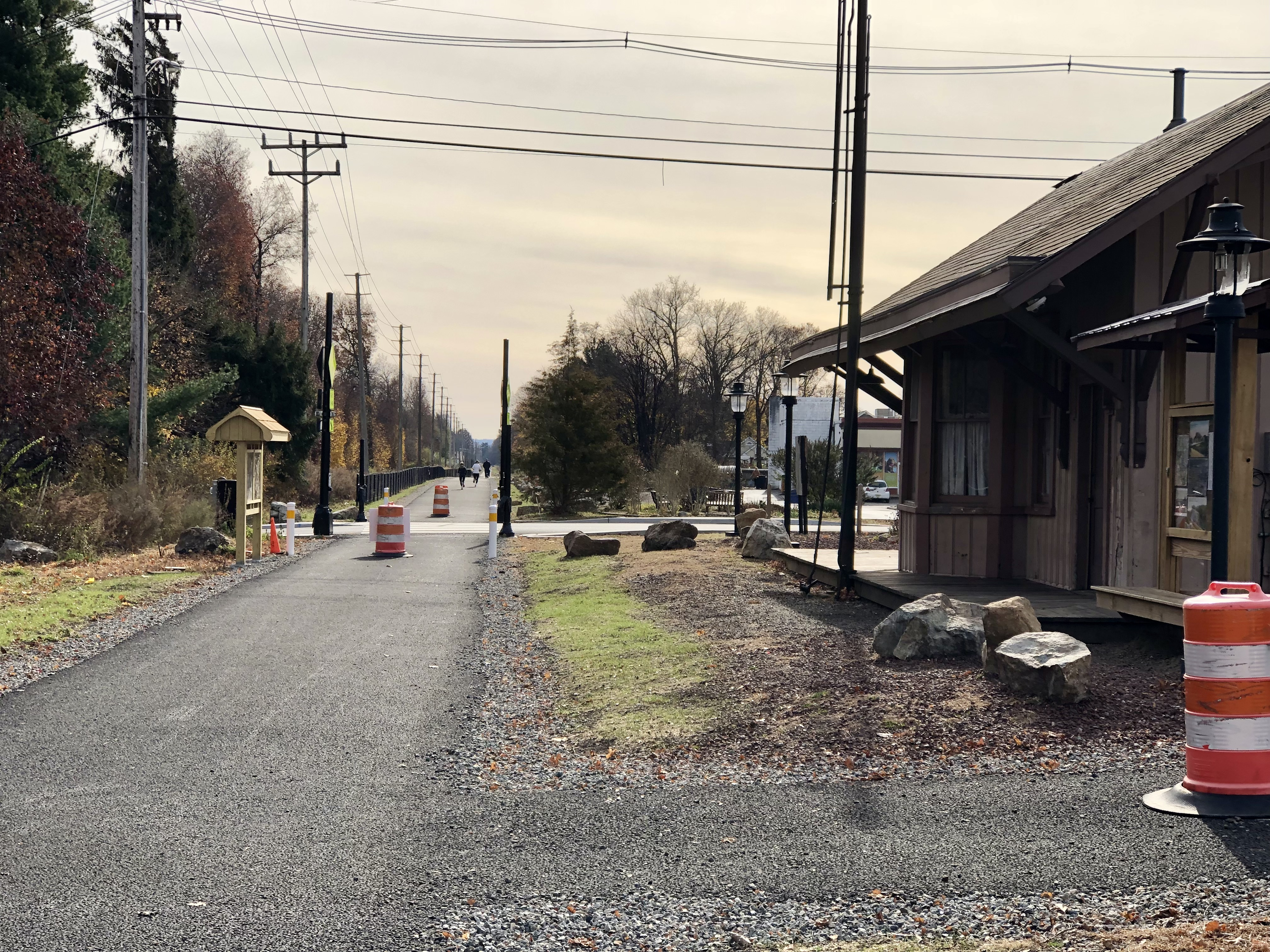
A view south along the rail trail next to the station in 2023

== See also ==
- Operating Passenger Railroad Stations Thematic Resource (New Jersey)
- National Register of Historic Places listings in Morris County, New Jersey

== Bibliography ==
- Baxter, Raymond J.; Adams, Arthur G. (1999). Railroad Ferries of the Hudson: And Stories of a Deckhand. Fordham, New York: Fordham University Press. ISBN 9780823219544.
- Whittemore, Henry (1894). History of Montclair Township, State of New Jersey: Including the History of Families who Have Been Identified with Its Growth and Prosperity. New York, New York: The Suburban Publishing Company.
