= Pompton Junction station =

Former railroad station in New Jersey

Pompton Junction
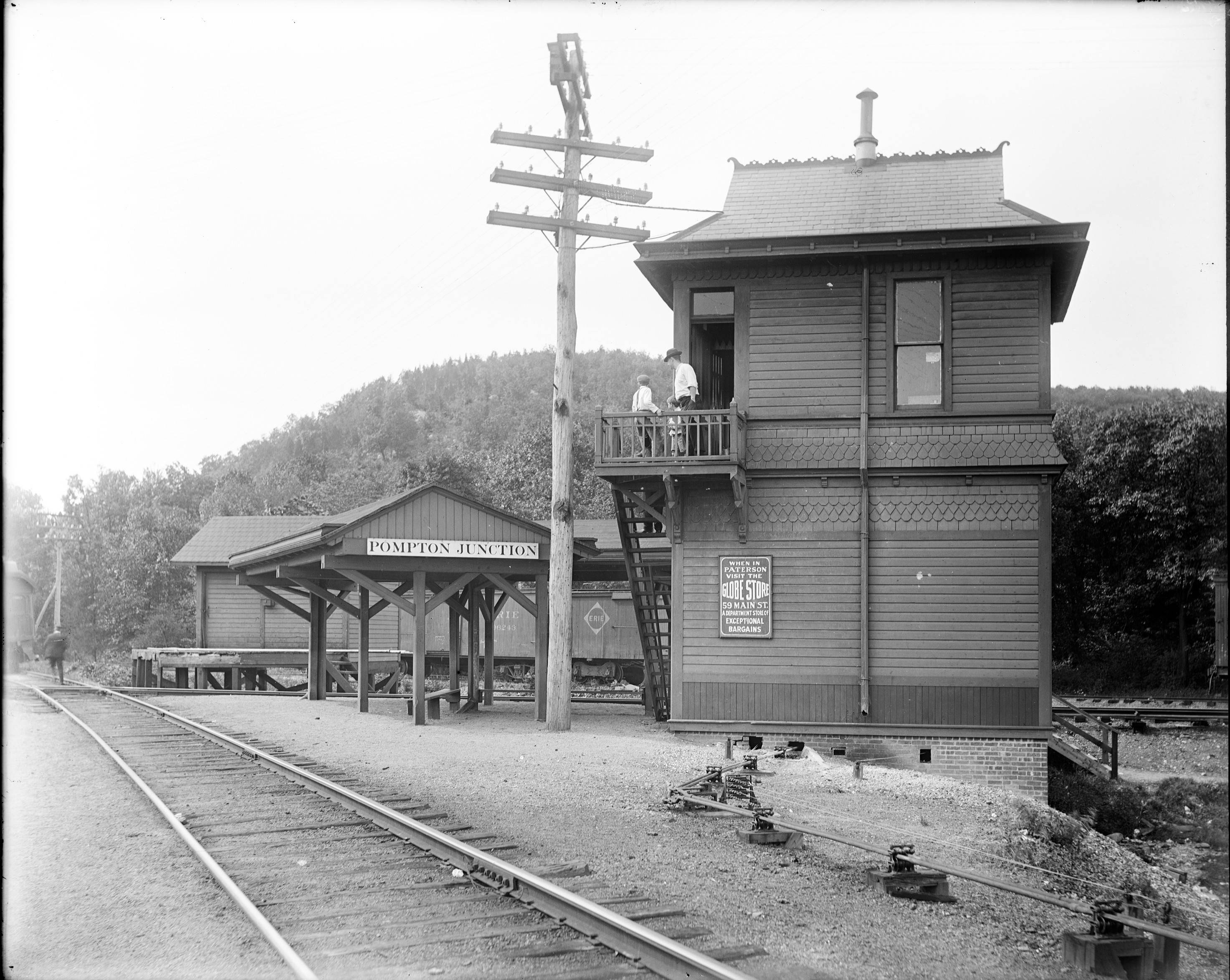
- Pompton Junction station site from the Susquehanna side, c. 1907-1912.

General information
- Location: Montclair Avenue, Pompton Lakes, New Jersey, US 07442
- Coordinates: 41°00′13″N 74°18′00″W
- Lines: New York and Greenwood Lake Railroad; New York, Susquehanna and Western Railroad
- Platforms: 2 side platforms
- Tracks: 4

Construction
- Platform levels: 1

Other information
- Station code: 1145 (New York, Susquehanna and Western); 1785 (New York and Greenwood Lake); PJ (NYS&W)

History
- Opened: January 1, 1873; 153 years ago

Former services
Preceding station	Erie Railroad	Following station
Haskell toward Sterling Forest	New York and Greenwood Lake Railway	Pompton–Riverdale toward Jersey City
Preceding station	New York, Susquehanna and Western Railroad	Following station
Bloomingdale toward Stroudsburg	Main Line	Pompton Lakes toward Susquehanna Transfer or Jersey City
Location

Pompton Junction is a former railroad station and active railroad junction in the borough of Pompton Lakes, New Jersey, United States. The station is located on the New York and Greenwood Lake Railway and the New York, Susquehanna and Western Railway, both subsidiaries of the Erie Railroad. Pompton Junction contained two side platforms at a diamond crossing, with a station depot on the Susquehanna Railroad side and a station canopy on the Greenwood Lake side. A railroad tower with the telegraph call letters "PJ" was present on the Greenwood Lake side of the station.

The station opened with the construction of the Montclair Railway, a subsidiary of the New York and Oswego Midland Railroad, on January 1, 1873. The Erie Railroad closed the station in November 1921 for a few months, before reopening again in January 1922. On the New York and Greenwood Lake side, the Erie closed the station for good in September 1930 and the Susquehanna Railroad station burned down on May 8, 1941.

== History ==
=== Opening ===
Pompton Junction station began service on January 1, 1873, once the Montclair Railway, a subsidiary of the New York and Oswego Midland Railroad, was completed to the station at Monks (near the current Monksville Reservoir). The New York and Oswego Midland had finished their tracks at the site by April 1871, with further extension westward soon following. Service on the Midland side began on May 1, 1872, with a stretch from Jersey City to Middletown, New York. At the beginning, Pompton Junction had six trains per day, making the 27.5 miles (44.3 km), 1 hour, 32 minute trip to Jersey City.

Construction of the Pompton Junction stop caused immediate construction of businesses and a community around the station. A new hotel began construction that would serve 50 guests. This would eventually become the Passaic County Hotel. Several streets were also graded in the area for horse travel and housing. Some residences were put up nearby. At the beginning of service, the railroad lacked a proper depot and there were already plans to ask the railroads for one. However, the newly named New Jersey Midland Railroad was already in bankruptcy and in September, a deal had to be made for the railroad and the receiver of the debt to operate the railroad between Jersey City and Unionville, New York, to help keep service alive on the Susquehanna side. Under the deal, all service from Pompton Junction to the east would be operated by the Midland while the service west of Pompton Junction would be run by the receiver.

=== 1874 shootout ===
Pompton Junction received national media coverage in June 1874 after the railroad suffered a series of thefts at the station. Thieves stole in all $600 (1874 USD) worth of metals and clothing from railcars and locomotives. Armed with arrest warrants, William High, a special police officer from Paterson, with a man named William Murphy came to Pompton Junction to investigate.

Murphy went to the back and High the front of the house where the gang were staying. Knowing the gang would not reply if the pair were identified as police, when the gang's leader, Anderson called out in response to High's knock, High said he was Richard Devore, another gang member. However, Anderson's wife recognized the voice was not Devore's and alerted her husband. Murphy heard the conversation and alerted High, who retreated to the nearby road but Anderson, shooting from the second story, hit him in the chest. High fell while Murphy informed Anderson, who had come downstairs, that he had shot a police officer. Murphy, who was not a police officer, then detained and arrested Anderson, along with Devore and colleague John Titus, for the shooting and the warrants they had come with, bringing them back to Paterson to face charges.

High suffered gunshot wounds to his bladder, lungs, and bowels. He was too injured to be brought back to Paterson for treatment. Dr. John Quin (1824–1887) of Paterson came to Pompton Junction to take care of him. Newspapers speculated that High would die and John Warren, the recorder who charged Anderson, Devore, and Titus, went with Quin along with High's parents to take a statement in case he did. However, High survived and eventually died on November 3, 1899, of pneumonia.

=== Pre-decline years ===
By 1889, the station at Pompton Junction was seeing 10 trains on weekdays and 16 trains on weekends. Fares to reach Jersey City would cost $1 and a round trip was $1.50. 20 ticket packages cost $11 while a monthly pass was $8. The Erie Railroad, which had taken over the Susquehanna, helped promote the fact that at Pompton Junction a person could go fishing and swimming, along with excellent views of the Wanaque Valley. One hotel and two boarding houses were available for travelers who wished to stop at Pompton Junction.

In April 1893, John Titus, one of the three charged in the 1874 theft ring at Pompton Junction, was killed in the Woodside section of Newark. Titus, who was working as an engineer for the New York and Greenwood Lake Railway, primarily in the shop at Pompton Junction, died when a flat car fell off the jacks and crushed him.

In April 1903, the Erie moved the station back a bit from the tracks on the Greenwood Lake side of the tracks for no apparent reason. Speculation was that the move to help facilitate construction of a second track extension from Little Falls. However, by 1910, the second track had never occurred through Pompton Junction. At this point, the station only had a shelter and railroad tower on the Greenwood Lake side. A secondary platform was south of the junction as well. A two-story station depot and freight stop had been abandoned by then.

Thieves ended up breaking into the station in 1902 and 1908. In the latter situation, John Storms of Pompton stole $29, a hat and a golden watch from Pompton Junction. He also broke into the Straight Street depot of the Susquehanna Railroad.

=== Decline and multiple closures ===
In January 1917, the borough of Bloomingdale and Pompton Lakes agreed in Butler to prod the railroads for the construction of a new station at Pompton Junction. All municipalities involved felt that the Pompton Junction facilities were inadequate for use as inclement weather would make things worse for commuters. The communities would reconvene in February 1917, and within days, the Erie put in new walkways and bridges for passengers to use to access the Pompton Junction station.

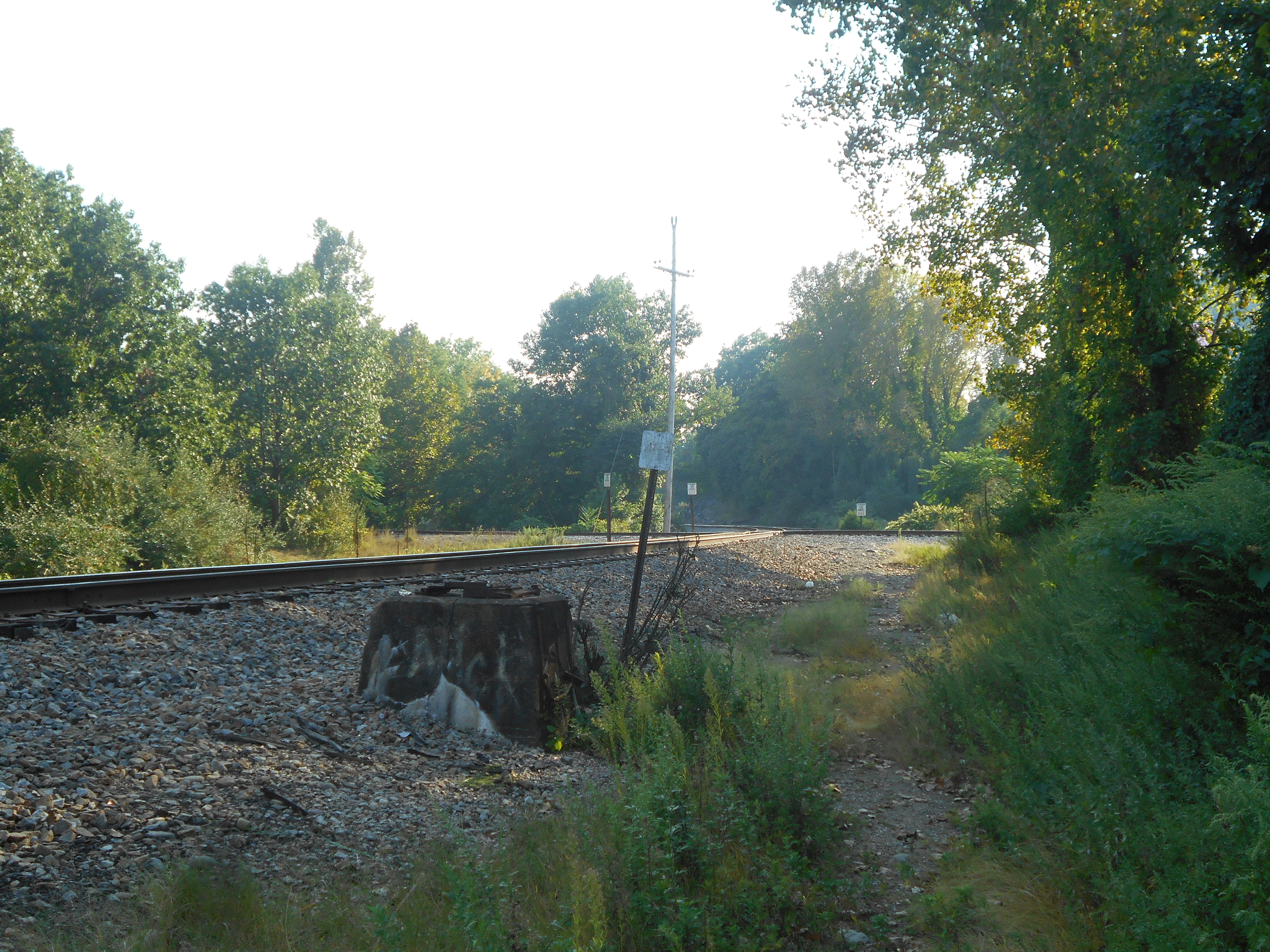
Pompton Junction station site from the Susquehanna side in September 2014

Despite improvements, the Erie closed the Greenwood Lake station side in November 1921. The freight and passenger services at Pompton Junction were moved to Pompton station and the agent was moved to the station at Wanaque-Midvale. The former railroad junction operator was moved to agent at Pompton station. The Erie Railroad reversed this decision in January 1922. The station agent that was moved to Pompton, moved back to Pompton Junction to serve as agent.

In November 1929, the Erie Railroad announced that they would be automating the railroad junction at Pompton Junction. As part of the automation process, PJ Tower would be rendered useless, with the semaphore signals replaced by flashing light-based signals. The wires controlling the junction from PJ Tower would also be eliminated. As part of this construction and improvement, the station at Pompton Junction would also be eliminated. The Public Utilities Commission gave the Erie permission to eliminate Pompton Junction's railroad structures. The old PJ Tower would serve passengers at Pompton Junction.

However, despite closure of the depot, the concept of a passenger station at Pompton Junction did not end. In 1932, the Erie Railroad and the New York, Susquehanna and Western Railroad considered a different option for Pompton Junction. They felt the possibility of moving the railroad facilities out of North Hawthorne to a joint terminal of railroads at Pompton Junction. This would cause Susquehanna trains to begin at Pompton Junction rather than North Hawthorne. The railroad tower was soon abandoned, and in January 1933, a felon vagrant was found living in the abandoned tower.

On May 8, 1941, Pompton Junction station burned to the ground. The station fire in the morning also did damage to the wires running the automated railroad junction. The belief is that the fire occurred from cigarettes left by vagrants who occupied the station during the evening.

== See also ==
- Montclair–Boonton Line

== Bibliography ==
- Baxter, Raymond J.; Adams, Arthur G. (1999). Railroad Ferries of the Hudson: And Stories of a Deckhand. Fordham, New York: Fordham University Press. ISBN 9780823219544.
- Catlin, George L. (1873). Homes on the Montclair Railway, for New York Business Men. A Description of the Country Adjacent to the Montclair Railway, Between Jersey City and Greenwood Lake. New York, New York: Montclair Railway Company.
- Farmer, L.P. (1889). Picturesque Erie: Summer Homes. Erie Railroad.
- Jones, Wilson; Taber, Thomas T.; Lessersohn, Harold; Webber, William S. (1975). The Next Station Will Be...Volume 2: Erie Greenwood Lake Division. Roselle Park, New Jersey: Railroadians of America.
- Mohowski, Robert E. (2003). The New York, Susquehanna and Western Railroad. Baltimore, Maryland: The Johns Hopkins University Press. ISBN 0-8018-7222-7.
- Whittemore, Henry (1894). History of Montclair Township, State of New Jersey: Including the History of Families who Have Been Identified with Its Growth and Prosperity. New York, New York: The Suburban Publishing Company.
- Carlough, Curtis V.; Fredericks, Harold; Stuy, Timothy; Van Dyk, Fred (1999). The Next Station Will Be... Volume 1 (Revised). New Jersey Midland Railroad Historical Society, Inc. ISBN 9780941652155.
