= Corpus Christi Church (Dayton, Ohio) =

Roman Catholic Church in Dayton, Ohio, United States

Coordinates: 39°46′26″N 84°12′09″W

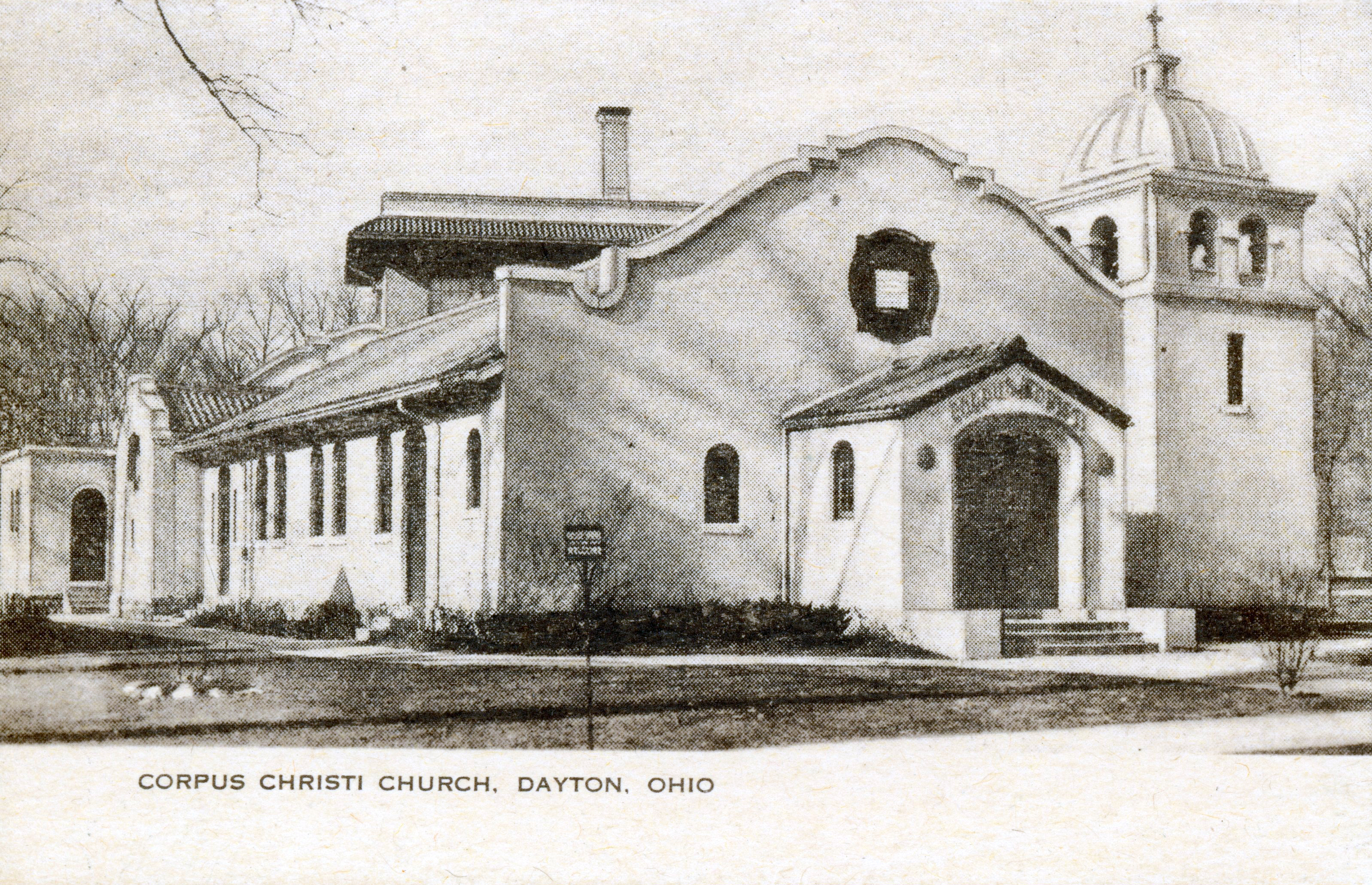
- Location: Dayton, Ohio, U.S.
- Address: 527 Forest Avenue, Dayton, OH 45405
- Country: United States
- Language: English
- Denomination: Catholic
- Tradition: Roman Rite
- Website: ourladyofgracedayton.org

History
- Status: Parish church
- Founded: 10 July 1911
- Dedication: Corpus Christi

Architecture
- Functional status: Active
- Architectural type: Church

Administration
- Archdiocese: Cincinnati
- Parish: The Holy Spirit Family of Parishes

Clergy
- Priest(s): Father Francis Tandoh, C.S.Sp.

Corpus Christi Church is a Mission Revival style church located at the corner of Forest and Homewood Avenues in the Five Oaks neighborhood of Dayton, Ohio. Architect, William E. Russ, designed the church. It was completed in 1911, formed by extension from other local parishes, Emmanuel, St. Joseph, and Sacred Heart. The church has been an important part of the neighborhood for over a century, notably for its distinctive architecture. Since January 2010, the church has been part of the Our Lady of Grace Parish, under the pastoral leadership of the Congregation of the Holy Spirit Fathers (Spiritans).

== History ==
=== Foundation and early years (1907–1915) ===
The establishment of Corpus Christi Parish originated from a Catholic population that occupied Dayton's northwest neighborhoods in the early 20th century. In 1907, locals, Joseph Wenz, George Pflaum, and John Foose advocated for a new parish in the Riverdale and Dayton View suburbs. Their efforts led to Archbishop Henry Moeller of Cincinnati granting the request for the new Corpus Christi congregation in 1909.

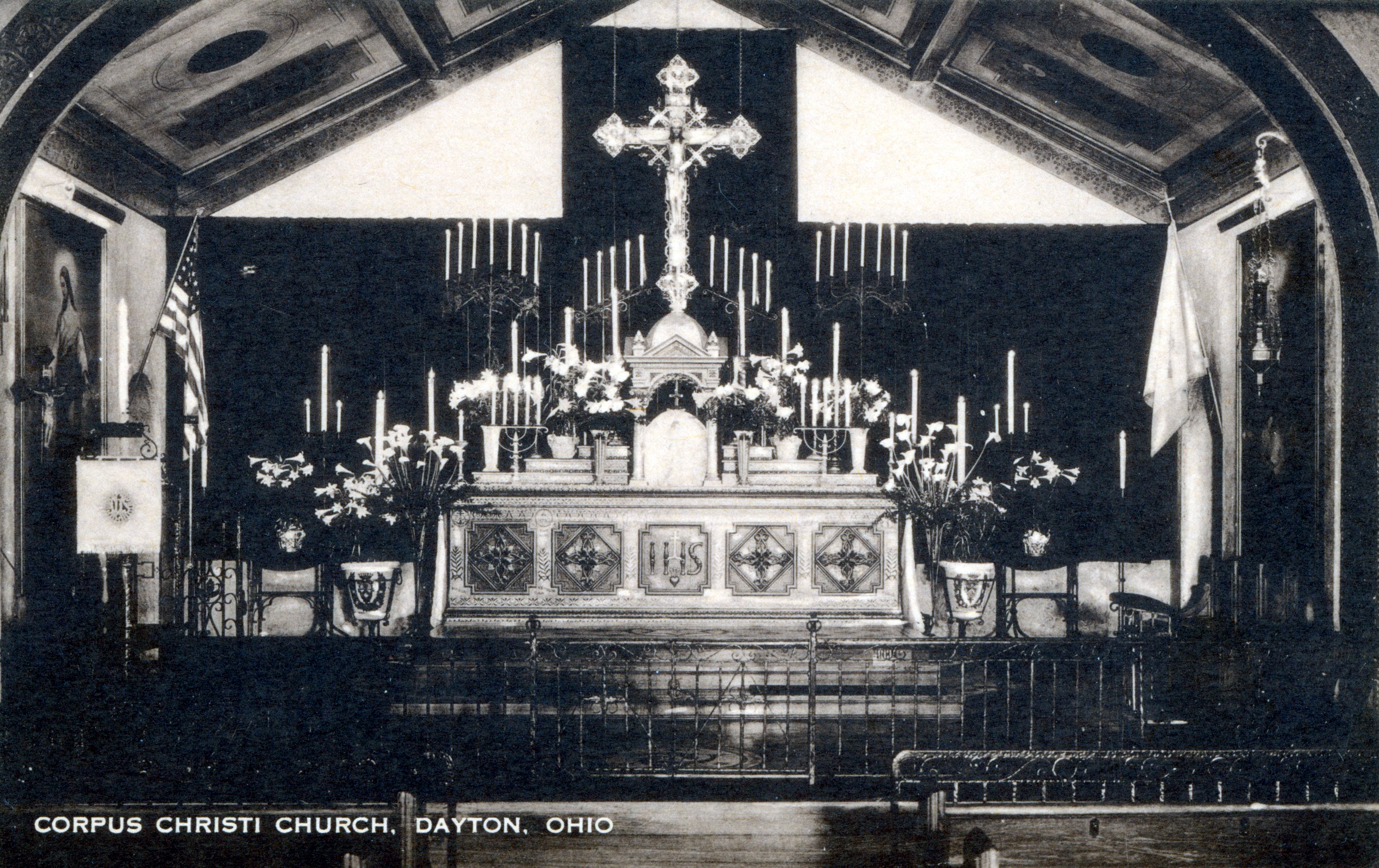
Former interior of Corpus Christi Church Dayton, Ohio

The church was designed by William E. Russ, who was chosen for the project after a proposal to relocate an existing frame structure (previously a temporary chapel for St. Joseph's congregation) from Sears Street to Forest and Homewood, this was rejected due to cost.

Groundbreaking for the new church occurred on July 10, 1911. Corpus Christi Church was formally dedicated on Christmas Eve in 1911. Archbishop Moeller assisted at the dedication ceremonies, alongside other clergy, featuring a sermon by Rev. John Hickey of the Holy Name Church in Cincinnati, and musical contributions from the Boys Choir of St. Joseph's Orphanage in Cincinnati. Reverend John T. Gallagher was appointed the first pastor of Corpus Christi following the dedication of the new St. Joseph's Church on March 19, 1911. Corpus Christi's first mass was celebrated in a rented flatiron building known as Smith's Hall at the corner of Main Street and Forest Avenue, with the first Mass held on Easter Sunday, April 16.

In 1915, Corpus Christi Church formed part of St. Agnes parish in Dayton alongside Sacred Heart Church, and Emmanuel Catholic Church's parish.

=== Growth and community (1910s–1950s) ===
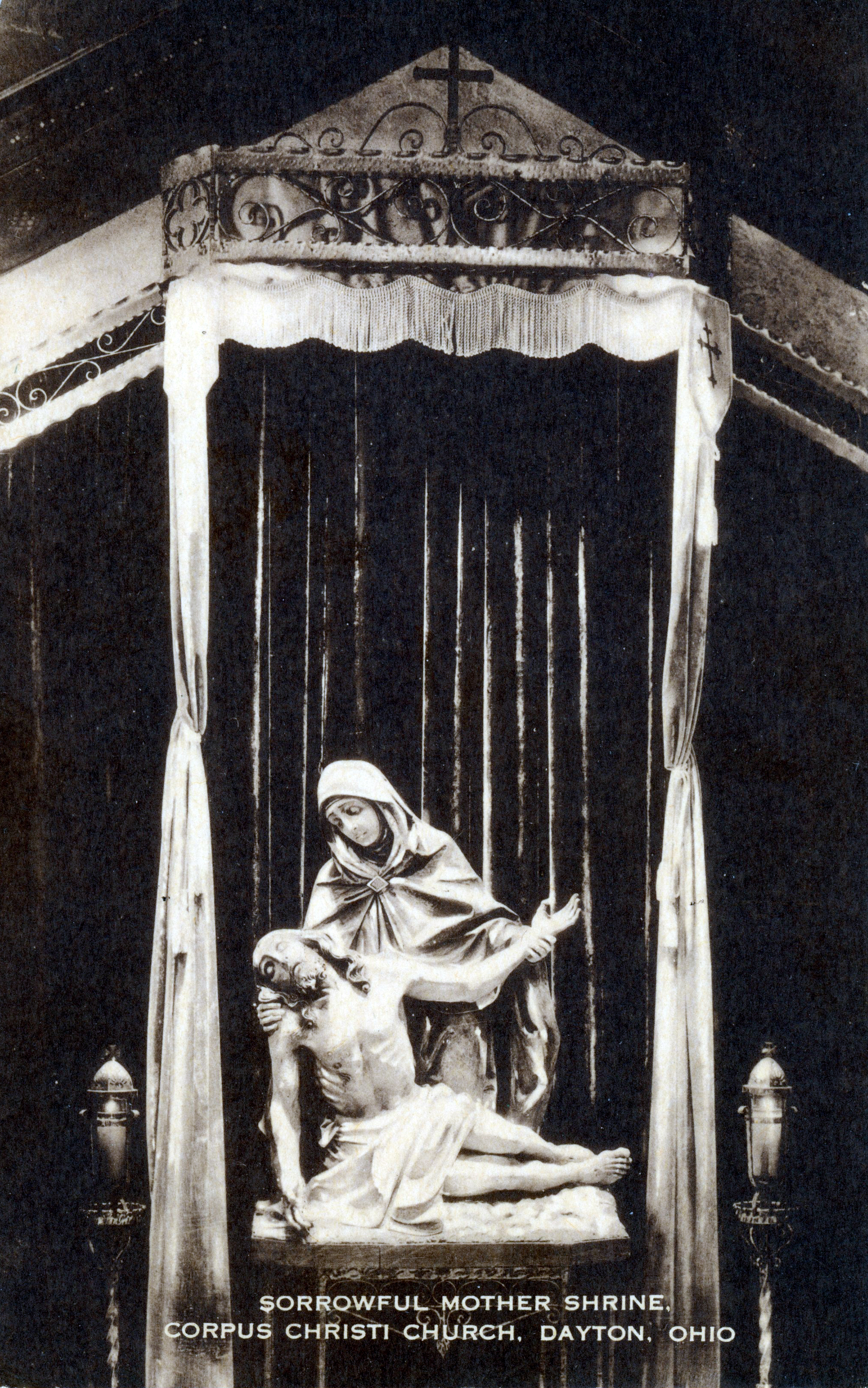
Historic photo of Sorrowful Mother Shrine inside Corpus Christi Church

==== 1910s ====
Corpus Christi school open in 1912 with 130 students. While the school was being built, classes were held in the church for about two months, with children using the pews as desk, and kneelers as seats. When the completed school opened in November, eight grades were taught in four classrooms, with two grades sharing each classroom. In 1913 during the Great Flood, parish buildings were not affected, however, half of the parishioners suffered flood damage and the school closed for six weeks, postponing the then First Holy Communion Sunday to June of that year. A parishioner of the parish, Robert Mayl also became ordained in 1913 and said his first Mass in the Corpus Christi church.

By 1916, growth of parish activities such as clubs and societies necessitated a pastor assistant, subsequently, Rev. John L. Kelly was appointed at the first assistant pastor of Corpus Christi until 1918, when he left to serve as a chaplain in the army during World War I. Corpus Christi at this time due to World War I, had produced the Corpus Christi Cadets, an organization of school boys who joined the Junior Naval Marines under the command of Colonel Williamson.

School enrollment was reportedly steady, as by 1917, 300 students were enrolled. Sunday Masses were also increased to four.

During the 1918 flu epidemic, Masses were held outside under a canopy provided by Peter Kuntz. Fr. Gallagher due to exposure after visiting sick parishioners, became infected by the flu and died on November 5th, 1918. Three days later a Pontifical Requiem Mass for him was sung by Archbishop Moeller. After Fr. Gallagher's death, Rev. James A. Fogarty was appointed pastor of Corpus Christi.

==== 1920s ====
In July of 1922, Rev. Thomas J. Cobey, the then former assistant pastor, resigned due to worsening health, then died suddenly. After his resignation, Rev. Raphael Sourd was appointed as Administrator of Corpus Christi.

On March 27, 1924, Archbishop Moeller appointed Rev. Albert A. Burke as a new pastor after Fr. Sourd served as Administrator for three months. Following post World War I industrial growth and inflation, a property for the Sisters who served the school was bought for $30,000.

In May 1927, Corpus Christi obtained property at Old Orchard, Homewood, and Squirrel Road for $37,000 as a then prospective site for a new church. By 1927, school enrollment reportedly reached almost 500.

In the November of 1928, Fr. Burke was transferred to St. Agnes Parish in Cincinnati, and Rev. Francis Reardon of the Holy Name Parish in Cincinnati was appointed as his successor at Corpus Christi.

During the Great Depression, Corpus Christi made further expansions to the church, school, and Sister's house. The parish also developed a Catholic Evidence Guild for advanced instruction in religion.

==== 1930s ====
The Miracle at Cana painting, photographed in 1930

In 1930, the main altar was trimmed down, and the two side altars were renovated into new ones. Additional wrought iron altar railing and cross beams were also installed alongside new imported paintings titled, The Miracle at Cana and The Miracle of the Loaves and Fishes. These were installed on each side of the main altar. The Dayton Daily News on March 23rd of this year, reported on the paintings as "two exceptionally fine paintings," highlighting the paintings were by Bernard Wagner, who reportedly received awards for his work in general, and previously designed the murals inside the Boston Public Library. The sanctuary and body of the church were also redecorated. in 1931, a new floor was installed along with a new pulpit.

The Miracle of the Loaves and Fishes painting, photographed in 1930

In 1934, a public assembly was conducted after a mass and banquet celebrating Fr. Reardon's Silver Jubilee. The principal address was given by Mayor Charles Brennan.

In 1935, Fr. Reardon was transferred to St. William's parish in Cincinnati and was replaced by Rev. Harry J. Ansbury. In 1939 Rev. William Staudt, C.PP.S. became assistant pastor.

==== 1940s ====
Due to World War II, the Corpus Christi service flag that was designed by the pastor, had been copied by the City of Dayton for honoring its own employees in the military. The parish would have some of its own members who died in the war, a total 470 of its members had contributed to the armed services. During this same time period, the church had further redecorations and fluorescent lighting installed.

In the years following World War II's end, the total number of Catholics in the parish was claimed to be about 4,000 (approximately 1,200 families).

==== 1950s ====
In 1952, a new transept was built on the south side of the church, along with a new tile roof, stucco siding, and vines.

On August 19th, 1956 a recreational center was completed with dedication ceremonies conducted by the Archbishop. At the time it had some books in a lending library on loan from the Dayton Public Library.

=== Centennial and recent renovations (2011–present) ===
In 2011, Corpus Christi Church celebrated its centennial with special events, including a Mass presided over by Archbishop Dennis M. Schnurr, assisted by Holy Ghost Father Joshua Otusafo and other priests and deacons. Introductory and liturgical music was provided by a brass quartet from Wright State University and a choir comprising current and former members of Corpus Christi, Our Lady of Mercy, and Queen of Martyrs parishes.

== Architecture ==
The Dayton Herald (Dayton Daily News) at the time noted that the church's unique style was chosen to "break away from the stereotyped forms of church architecture" prevalent in the region. Describing the church as a "replica of the old Spanish missions in Mexico and California," praising its "Old World picture" when sunlight illuminated its red tiled roof and white stucco walls. While the church building was new, its interior furnishings were repurposed from the old St. Joseph's Church, donated by Rev. William D. Hickey.

In 2023, the Our Lady of Grace Parish undertook significant exterior renovations of the church. Although the original tile roof could not be preserved, a pressed metal replacement was installed, designed as a replica that retained the historic aesthetic of the structure.
