= Riversdale =

Riversdale may refer to:

- Riversdale, Colchester County, Canada
- Riversdale, Goulburn, a heritage-listed house in Goulburn, New South Wales, Australia
- Riversdale, Jamaica, a village in the parish of Saint Catherine
- Riversdale (Riverdale Park, Maryland), National Historic Landmark whose property became the foundation for the University of Maryland
- Riversdale Mining, an Australian business with mines in Africa
- Riversdale, New Zealand, a small town in Southland, New Zealand
- Riversdale, Queensland, Australia
- Riversdale railway station, Melbourne, Australia
- Riversdale, Rathfarnham, Ireland, the last home of William Butler Yeats
- Riversdale, Region of Queens Municipality, Canada
- Riversdale, Saskatchewan, neighbourhood in the city of Saskatoon, Saskatchewan, Canada
- Riversdale, Western Cape, a town in South Africa

== See also ==
- Riverdale (disambiguation)
