= Riverdale station =

Riverdale station may refer to:

- Riverdale station (Metro-North) in New York City
- Riverdale station (Toronto) in Toronto
- Riverdale station (Illinois) in Illinois
- Riverdale station (Erie Railroad) in Riverdale, New Jersey

== See also ==
- Riverdale Park station (disambiguation)
