= Riverdale (Odessa, Delaware) =

Historic house in Delaware, United States

- U.S. National Register of Historic Places
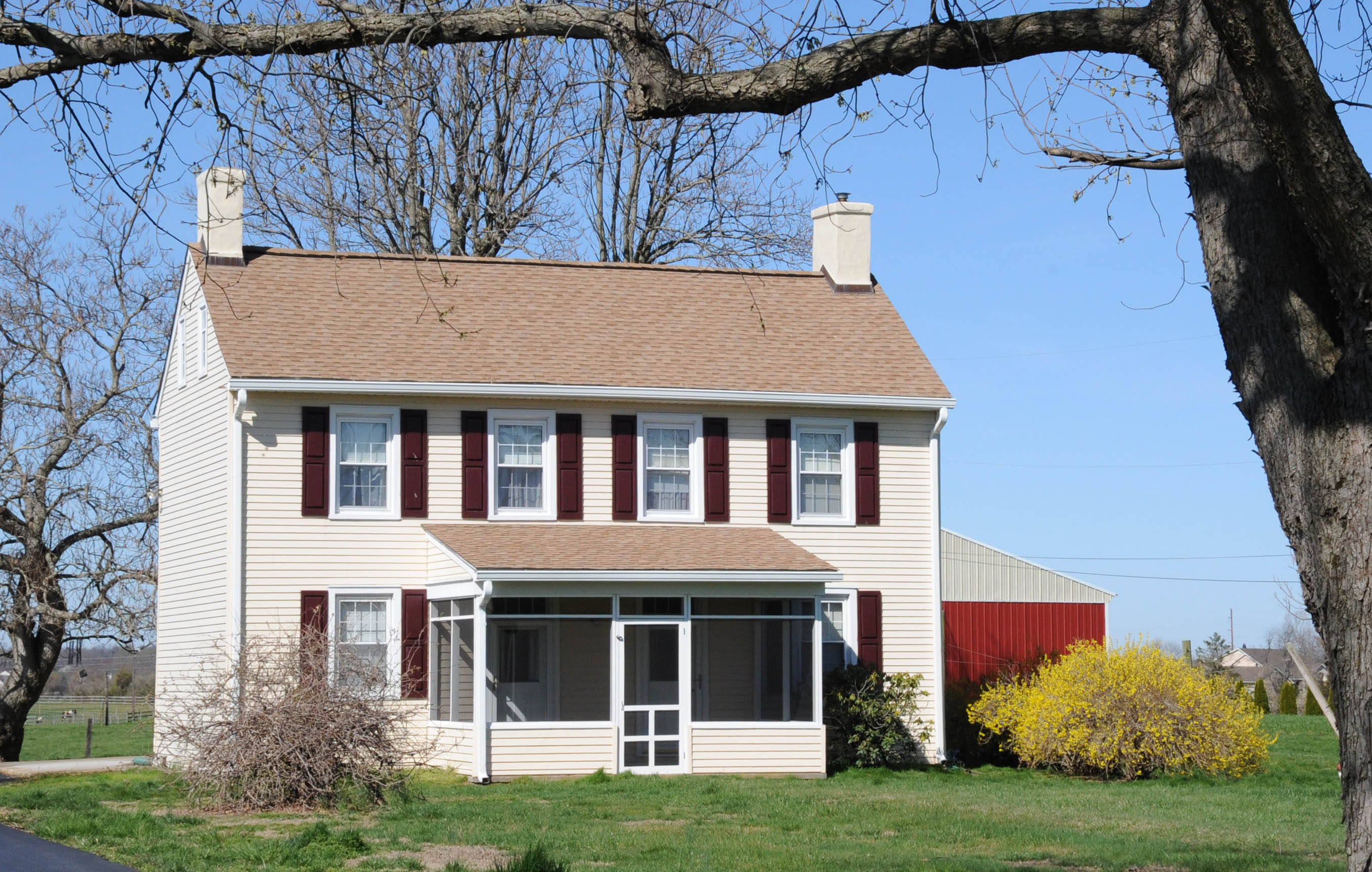

- Location within Delaware Location within the United States
- Location: 1211 Silver Run Rd. in St. Georges Hundred, near Odessa, Delaware
- Coordinates: 39°29′09″N 75°36′17″W
- Area: 9.5 acres (3.8 ha)
- Built: c. 1840
- MPS: Rebuilding St. Georges Hundred 1850--1880 TR
- NRHP reference No.: 85003525
- Added to NRHP: November 19, 1985

Riverdale is a historic home located near Odessa, New Castle County, Delaware. It was built about 1840, and consists of the four-bay-wide, single-room-deep rectangular core of the house with a 22-foot, two-story L-shaped extension. Both sections have gable roofs. Also on the property is the site of a number of demolished outbuildings.

It was listed on the National Register of Historic Places in 1985.
