= Riverdale High School =

Riverdale High School may refer to:

== Schools ==
Canada

- Riverdale High School (Quebec)

United States

- Riverdale High School, Riverdale, California (Riverdale Joint Unified School District)
- Riverdale High School (Florida)
- Riverdale High School (Georgia)
- Riverdale High School (Illinois)
- Riverdale High School (Jefferson Parish, Louisiana)
- Riverdale High School (Hancock County, Ohio)
- Riverdale High School (Oregon)
- Riverdale High School (Tennessee)
- Riverdale Junior and Senior High School, Wisconsin
- The high school component of Riverdale School District 89, North Dakota

== Fictional entities ==
- Riverdale High School (Archie Comics), the fictional school in Archie Comics

== See also ==
- Riverdale Collegiate Institute, a high school in Toronto, Ontario, Canada
