= Riverdale Township =

Riverdale Township may refer to:

- Riverdale Township, Kossuth County, Iowa
- Riverdale Township, Watonwan County, Minnesota
- Riverdale Township, Buffalo County, Nebraska
- Riverdale Township, Dickey County, North Dakota, in Dickey County, North Dakota
