= Pompton–Riverdale station =

Former railway station in Morris County, New Jersey, US

Pompton–Riverdale
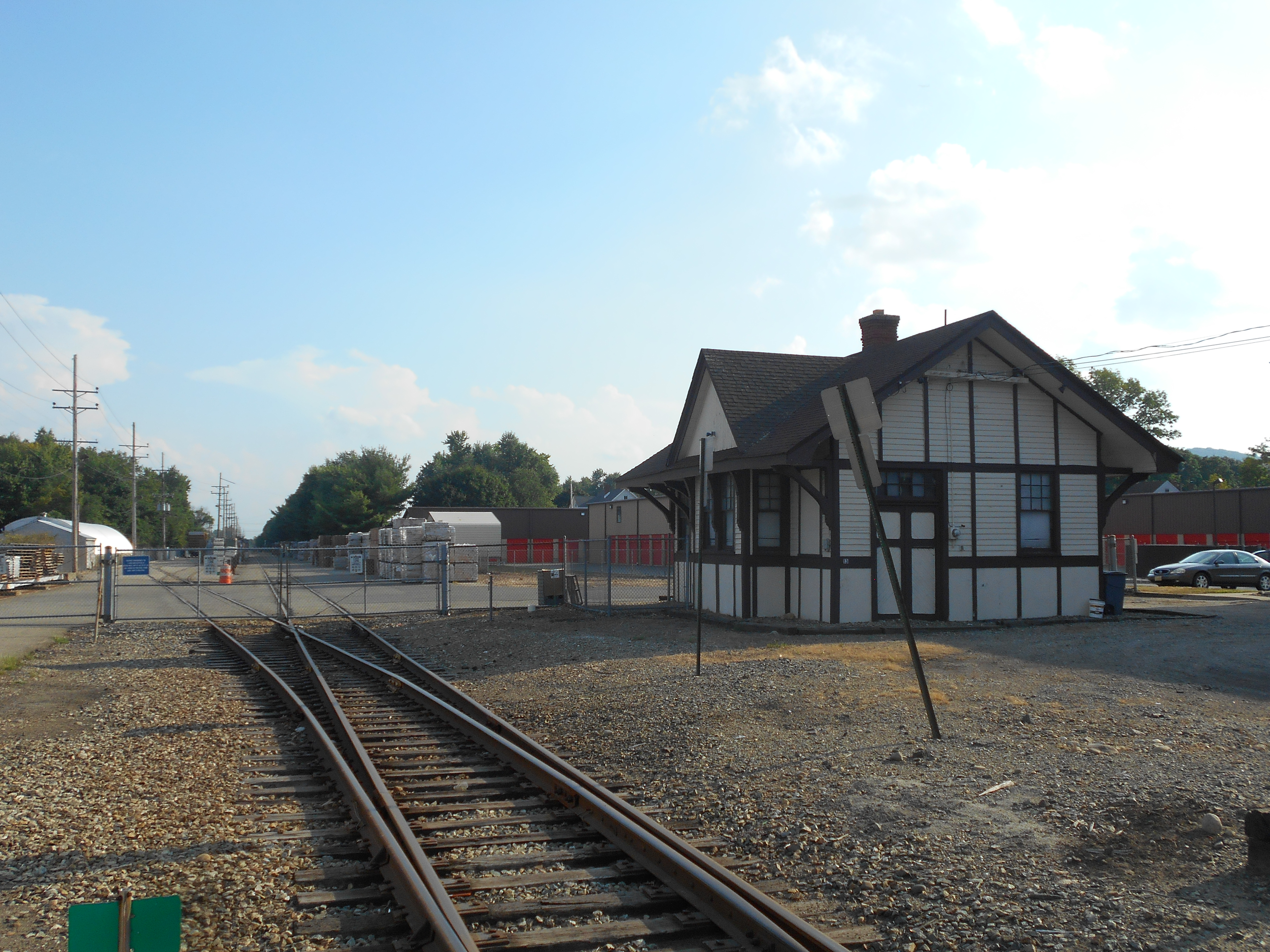
- Pompton–Riverdale station in September 2014.

General information
- Location: 13 Pompton–Hamburg Turnpike (CR 511 Alternate), Riverdale, New Jersey
- Lines: New York and Greenwood Lake Railway
- Platforms: 1 side platform
- Tracks: 2

Construction
- Platform levels: 1

Other information
- Station code: 1781 (Riverdale); 1783 (Pompton)

History
- Opened: January 1, 1873; 153 years ago
- Closed: September 30, 1966; 59 years ago
- Former names: Pompton (1873–1951)

Former services
Preceding station	Erie Railroad	Following station
Pompton Junction toward Sterling Forest	New York and Greenwood Lake Railway	Pompton Plains toward Jersey City

Pompton–Riverdale station is a defunct commuter railroad station in the borough of Riverdale, Morris County, New Jersey. Located on Paterson–Hamburg Turnpike (County Route 511 Alternate, the station serviced trains of the Erie Railroad's New York and Greenwood Lake Railway and later the Erie-Lackawanna Railroad's shuttle to Wanaque after 1963. Pompton–Riverdale station contained a single side platform with the station depot and two tracks.

== History ==
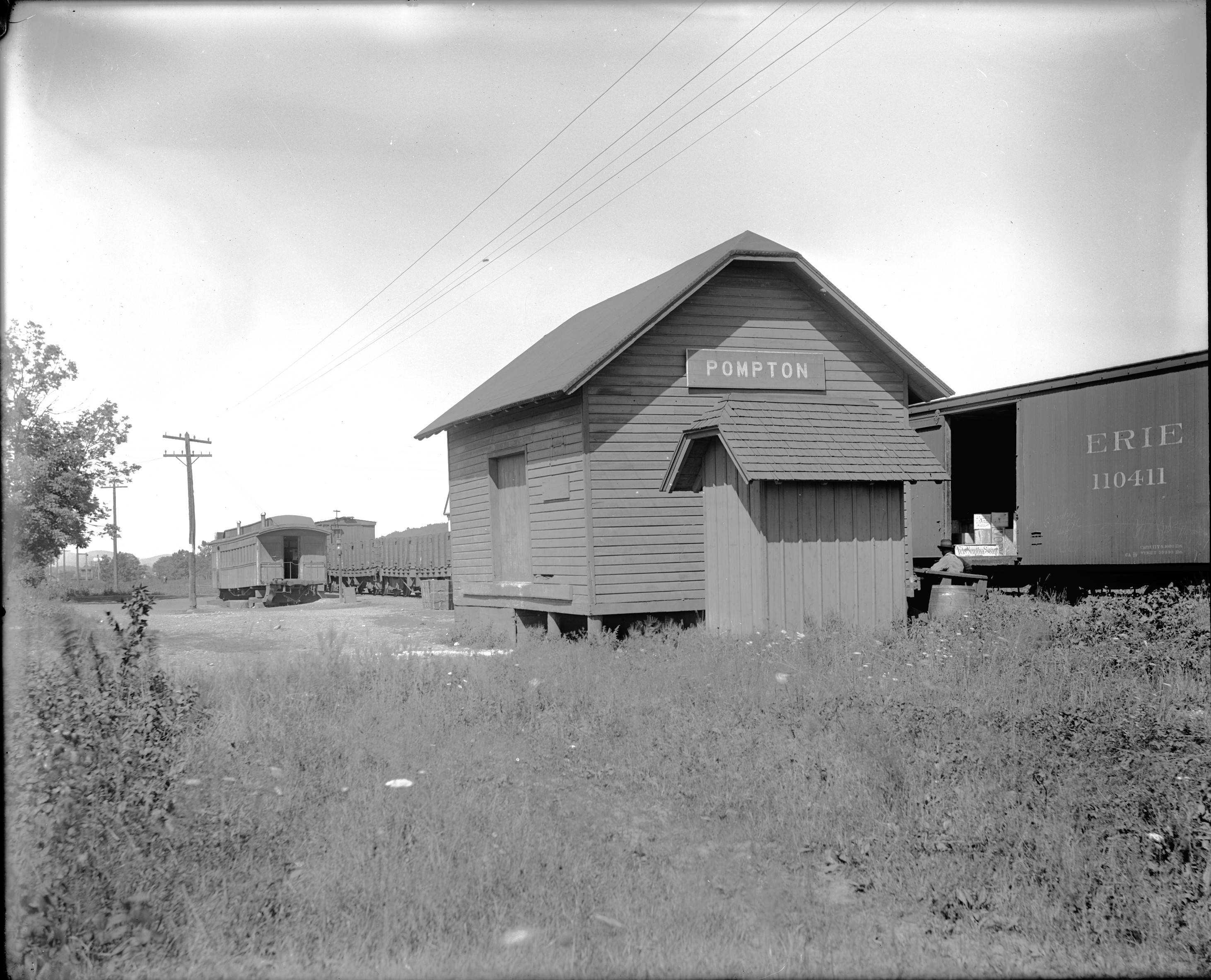
The former Pompton station, c. 1907–1912

Service at the station began on January 1, 1873 as part of the Montclair Railway, built for operations of the New York and Oswego Midland Railroad. At that time, the stop was known as Pompton. This service became a part of the New York and Greenwood Lake in December 1878, followed by the Erie Railroad in 1896. The old station depot at Pompton burned down on December 9, 1904. After the fire, the Erie Railroad turned former passenger and freight combination car no. 793 on the side of the tracks to serve as a bonafide depot for passenger service. The nearby borough of Pompton Lakes brought the Erie Railroad to a hearing of the Board of Railroad Commissioners in 1909 to complain about the state of the station. The Commissioners ordered the Erie Railroad to build a new structure at Pompton.

At the same time, there was a stop south of Pompton known as Riverdale, located just east of modern-day Route 23. Also opened in 1873, the stop also served Riverdale, but 1.0 mile (1.6 km) from downtown and 0.7 miles (1.1 km) south of Pompton station, confusing riders of the railroad. By 1951, the station was a flag stop that the Erie wanted to rid itself of. Opposition was non-existent and the Board of Public Utility Commissioners allowed the Erie to eliminate the stop on July 20, 1951. The name Riverdale was moved to the Pompton station after the elimination of the Riverdale stop, changing the name to Pompton–Riverdale.

After years of declining service, the Erie merged with the Delaware, Lackawanna and Western Railroad on October 17, 1960, forming the Erie-Lackawanna Railway. On October 27, 1963, as part of the Passaic Plan, which ripped out the Erie Main Line tracks in Passaic and the Lackawanna Boonton Branch through Paterson, service at Pompton–Riverdale was reduced to a shuttle service between the Mountain View station in Wayne to Wanaque–Midvale. Service on this shuttle ended on September 30, 1966 when the Erie Lackawanna discontinued several branch lines.

Despite the ending of passenger service, freight at the station and along the line continued after 1966. In 1968, the Erie Lackawanna applied to have the station agent at Pompton–Riverdale be discontinued. The Public Utilities Commissioners held a hearing on June 11 in which the Erie Lackawanna contended that the freight revenue did not make an agent economically viable. However, the Commissioners sided with the opposition in July, forcing the Erie Lackawanna to continue the agent service. The Erie Lackawanna repeated the process in 1971. This time a hearing was held on July 15, 1971. The borough of Riverdale expressed interest in buying the depot once the Erie Lackawanna agent was discontinued. This time, the agent was discontinued and the station was abandoned. The Erie Lackawanna offered up the depot for $10 (1971 USD) to the borough of Riverdale.

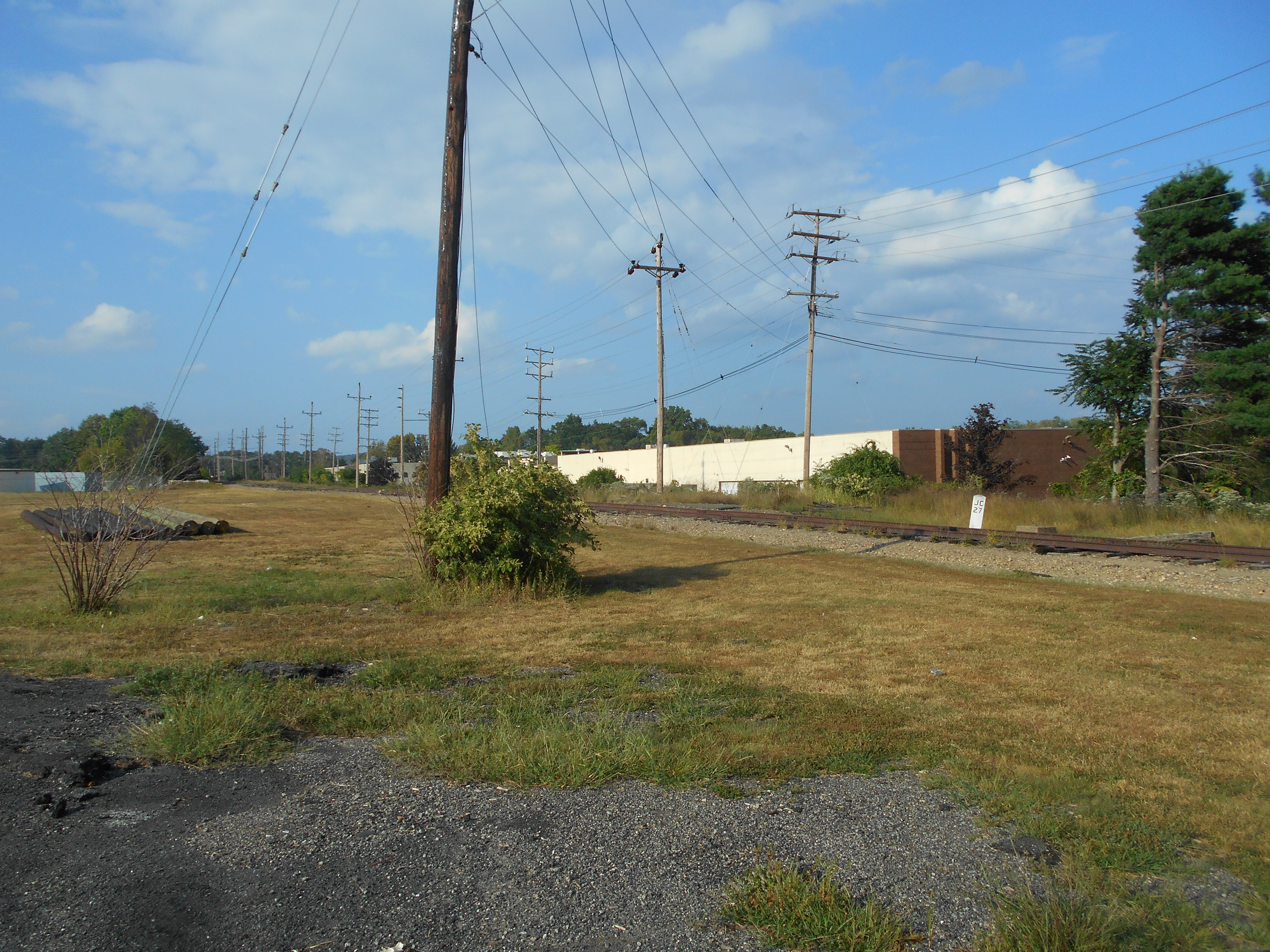
The site of the Riverdale station in September 2014

== See also ==
- Montclair-Boonton Line

== Bibliography ==
- Baxter, Raymond J.; Adams, Arthur G. (1999). Railroad Ferries of the Hudson: And Stories of a Deckhand. Fordham, New York: Fordham University Press. ISBN 9780823219544.
- Jones, Wilson; Taber, Thomas T.; Lessersohn, Harold; Webber, William S. (1975). The Next Station Will Be...Volume 2: Erie Greenwood Lake Division. Roselle Park, New Jersey: Railroadians of America.
- Whittemore, Henry (1894). History of Montclair Township, State of New Jersey: Including the History of Families who Have Been Identified with Its Growth and Prosperity. New York, New York: The Suburban Publishing Company.
- Board of Railroad Commissioners (1910). Third Annual Report of the Board of Railroad Commissioners of the State of New Jersey. Trenton, New Jersey: MacCrellish and Quigley, State Printers.
