= Riverdale, Dayton, Ohio =

Neighborhood in Dayton, Ohio

Riverdale is a neighborhood of Dayton, Ohio, United States. It is situated northwest of Dayton across the Great Miami River.

The Geographic Names Information System (GNIS) lists the location of Riverdale at 39°46′12″N 84°11′40″W, which is now a part of the McPherson Town Historic District.
