= Wanaque–Midvale station =

Wanaque-Midvale was a former railroad station in New Jersey, United States

WANAQUE–MIDVALE
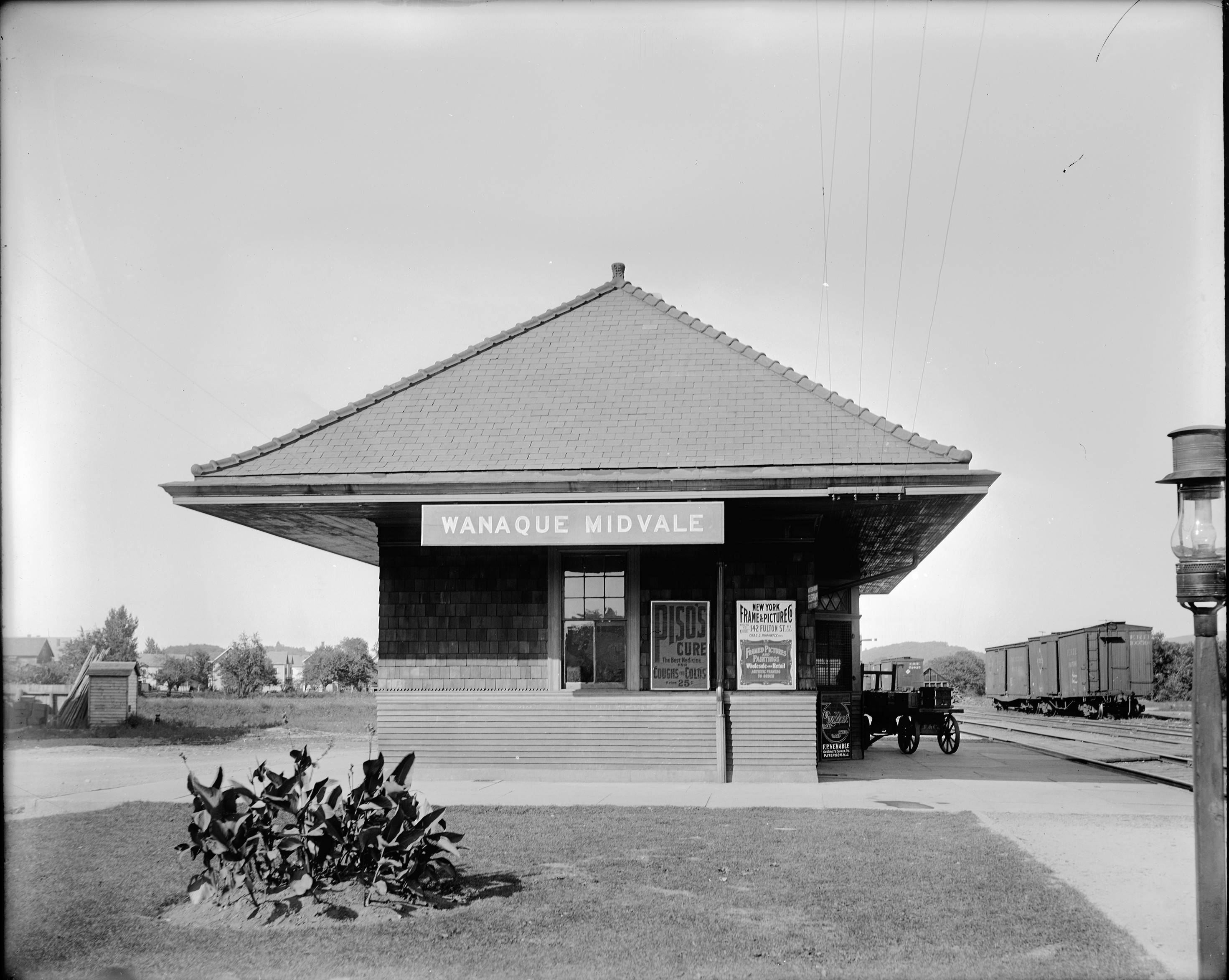
- The former station depot at Wanaque–Midvale, c. 1907–1912

General information
- Location: Railroad Avenue at Erie Street, Wanaque, New Jersey 07465
- Coordinates: 41.048908°N 74.287954°W
- Lines: New York and Greenwood Lake Railroad
- Platforms: 1 side platform
- Tracks: 2

Other information
- Station code: 1789

History
- Opened: January 1, 1873; 153 years ago
- Closed: September 30, 1966; 59 years ago
- Rebuilt: 1901; 125 years ago
- Electrified: Not electrified

Key dates
- December 4, 1967: Station depot burned

Services
Preceding station	Erie Railroad	Following station
Terminus	New York and Greenwood Lake Railway	Haskell toward Jersey City
Ringwood Junction (until 1935) toward Sterling Forest	New York and Greenwood Lake Railway	Haskell toward Jersey City
Location

Wanaque–Midvale station is a defunct commuter railroad station of the Erie Railroad's New York and Greenwood Lake Railway branch in Wanaque, New Jersey, United States. When built in 1873, the station served trains running from Pavonia Terminal in Jersey City to Sterling Forest on the New York–New Jersey border alongside Greenwood Lake and trains going to Ringwood on the Ringwood Branch. At the time there were two stations, one at Wanaque and one at Midvale. The next station northbound towards Sterling Forest was Boardville; heading towards Ringwood it was Erskine. The next station south was Haskell.

A new station was built in 1902. Service was cut back from Sterling Forest to Wanaque–Midvale in 1935, when the railroad north of Erskine was abandoned for the construction of roadways through the area, including Passaic County Route 704 (East Shore Road). Service on the line continued into the control of the Erie-Lackawanna Railroad, becoming a shuttle service between Mountain View station in Wayne and Wanaque–Midvale from October 25, 1963–September 30, 1966. Service on the line ended on September 13, 1966, when the shuttle was eliminated. The station depot burned down on December 4, 1967 while vacant.

== Station layout ==
	Wanaque Yard
Inbound	Greenwood Lake Division weekdays toward Hoboken (Haskell) →
Side platform, station depot (Note: The termini of Wanaque–Midvale and Hoboken Terminal recognize the destinations at the end of passenger service on June 30, 1966.)

== History ==
Railroad service through the Wanaque River area began on January 1, 1873 with the opening of the Montclair Railway, a service of the New York and Oswego Midland Railroad. At this time period, there were two stations in the area, one on the south side of the river in Wanaque, located at the crossing of modern-day County Route 511 and one at the north side of the river in Midvale. The Montclair Railway was taken over in December 1878 by the New York and Greenwood Lake Railway, which came under the control of the Erie Railroad on May 1, 1896.

The Erie built a new passenger station at Midvale in 1901. This new station depot was built at a design of 43 by 19 feet (13.1 m × 5.8 m) in design, with a freight house of 40 by 12 feet (12.2 m × 3.7 m). William Mullen, a local contractor, did the carpentry, roofing, iron, masonry and painting of the new passenger station at the cost of $2,025 (1901 USD).

=== 1904 crash ===
On July 10, 1904, two trains collided at the Wanaque–Midvale station. At 11:00 a.m., an excursion train with people from the First Plattdeutscher Association in Hoboken was headed to Greenwood Lake, getting water at Midvale. A regularly scheduled express train from Pavonia Terminal came bursting into the station, crashing into the stopped excursion train at the water tower, located 1,000 yards (910 m) north of the Wanaque–Midvale platform. The impact of the crash telescoped the rear two cars on the excursion train, injuring most of the passengers on board.

The sound of the crash rattled through Midvale and people from around the area came to the scene of the accident. Passengers who were able to escape both trains rushed to the nearby roadway and those who were trapped continued to yell for help. People went in to help get the injured out. People on both trains found the emergency toolboxes on the train and were able to get them used to cut away at the remains of the cars on the excursion train. Female civilians came with linen to help cover and clean injuries. Fourteen bodies were found and laid along the railroad tracks. The injured were carried to nearby houses for treatment. To their benefit, two physicians from New York City came to their help, after being in one of the trains. Seven other local physicians were on the scene not long after.

The Passaic County Physician and County Coroner were there within an hour and took control of the bodies of the deceased. Their bodies would be placed in a boxcar provided by the Erie Railroad, and transferred to Little Falls. At that point, the bodies would be given to the county's assistant prosecutor to use his barn as a morgue instead of bringing the bodies to Paterson. There the coroner would visit the bodies and have them transported to Hoboken.

The fireman and engineer of the express train vanished after the accident and headed to Jersey City. The Erie Railroad sent equipment from Little Falls to get to the wreckage. From there, the injured would be transported from Midvale to hospitals in Jersey City or Hoboken. The people who wanted to continue to Greenwood Lake were sent on a train forward to their destination while those who had relatives who died and/or got hurt and those who did not wish to continue to their destination were provided alternate transportation back home. In all, 15 were killed, all residents of Hoboken, West Hoboken, Jersey City or New York City. 35 were injured.

In the immediate aftermath of the crash, the railroad claimed that the tower operator in Midvale had no idea the express train was coming and failed to warn them in advance. The flagman of the excursion train's rear end went to warn the engineer of the second train, but the railroad curved near the tank and boxcars blocked the view of the engine and the flagman. The engineer could not see the flagman and slowed to around 10 miles per hour (16 km/h) when it crashed into the excursion train. The Erie foreman came after the crash with the wreck salvage crew. The foreman stated that the signal was set to warn the express train about the excursion train, though locals denied this, stating it was marked as clear. They believed it was changed 15 minutes after the accident.

J.F. Maguire, the Division Superintendent, wasted no time blaming that William Richard, who was the station agent at Midvale, failed to change the signal and that the flagman, Ernest Heller, had not gone far enough in view of the second train to flag the engineer.

Richards, Heller and a conductor of the train, were suspended, along with the crews of both trains. The Erie then promptly fired them once the railroad decided they were the ones to blame for this accident. An anonymous source in the railroad told The Bergen Evening Record that the belief is the real cause for this accident was that the person in charge was tasked to do multiple things himself instead of a job that multiple people should do. The person in charge was to require at least six different branches of the railroad, making it a tough task to control them all at once. William Richards also announced that he felt the railroad was working to smear his name to take blame off themselves. Richards stated that he had hired an attorney to defend his name and fight the railroad. Richards' father also spoke to the press, noting that when the agent took control of the station agent job in March, the signal equipment was in disorder. He stated that the warnings to the railroad about the bad equipment were left unheeded by the railroad and that he set the signal on Sunday to note it was not clear. This was his defense that the railroad was responsible, as the engineer of the express train backed him up stating that the signal was partly down.

On July 18, the jury of the Passaic County coroner, found that the actions of Richards and Heller were the ones leading to the accident and the death of now-16 lives and injuries to 50. Warrants were issued by the railroad for the arrest of Richards and Heller on manslaughter. The grand jury would convene in September to indict them. The conductor of the excursion train defended Heller, stating that he told Heller to go out and flag the second train. Charles Brodbeck, a member of the group on the excursion train, noted that the flag was about the length of a railroad car from the train and having the flag rolled up in his hand. The impact was almost immediate and Brodbeck had been sent flying off the platform and into a telegraph pole. William Hatchman, another excursion train rider, defended Brodbeck, stating that the conductor didn't unfurl the flag until the train was in the station area. Both were brought into custody on the evening of July 19 to Paterson. They were released on bail that same evening. On July 22, on a special section, the bail of Richards and Heller were raised from $1,000 (1904 USD) to $2,000 to guarantee they would answer the charges against them.

A grand jury did indict them and Heller and Richards were arraigned on October 10, 1904 for manslaughter. A trial was scheduled for October 13. However, the trial started in late November 1904. On November 21, the attorneys for the defense requested a motion that the state could not prove they were guilty of criminal negligence based on the evidence provided by the state. However, the judge denied this motion. The attorney then made his opening states explaining their defense. Among their witnesses were George Richards, a brother of the defendant William Richards and Andrew Vanderhoff, the conductor who had come to their defense in the past. Other Erie employees also defended that the express train engineer was at fault. Heller and Richards both testified in their own defense and explained the case that the semaphore signal at Midvale worked rare and improperly.

The case was handed to the jury on November 23. They deliberated for seven hours before returning to the court stating they were stuck. The jury had come to a seven to five vote in convicting William Richards. The separation on Ernest Heller was nine to three. The problems with coming to a decision on Richards was that they felt the Erie was negligent in not properly maintaining the semaphore. With Heller, they felt that he could have done better at his job, but the three dissenting jurors could not be swayed to say he was to blame for the accident and the sixteen deaths. Almost all of the jurors felt that other people should have been indicted along with Heller and Richards. Richards and Heller were acquitted of the charges against them.

=== Service truncation (1935) ===
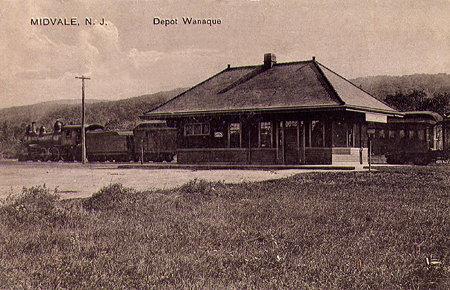
The station depot at Wanaque–Midvale as seen in a c. 1908 postcard with a steam commuter train in the station

In early 1935, the Erie railroad looked at abandoning railroad service north of Wanaque–Midvale to Sterling Forest. It was immediately opposed by people who said if a roadway was not at least constructed on the right-of-way they could never get away from their homes in the area going southward and would require a long detour around Greenwood Lake. On March 7, the railroad held an inspection tour with the Passaic County Planning Commission and Board of Freeholders, along with West Milford Township brass. The Erie noted that if they get permission to abandoned the section of railway, the Ringwood Company would acquire the right-of-way automatically. The Ringwood Company already agreed with residents that if it came into their control, the right-of-way would be converted to road for them from Hewitt station to Sterling Forest station. In response, New York state would be open to opening a state highway to that section of Sterling Forest for the residents to use.

The Interstate Commerce Commission's investigator, Thomas Sullivan, told the agency that it was alright to approve the Erie's request to abandon passenger service north of Wanaque and the right-of-way north of Erskine. The chair of the County Planning Commission, Ferdnand Friedrich and the Chair of the Freeholders, Harry Behrman, also threw their support behind the proposal. The residents at Sterling Forest admitted the service up there was being run at a significant loss, even with the lack of nearby highways. At least one resident requested service continue into the summer season of 1935 at minimum. Sullivan requested that the railroad could not do this before September 30 to help the businesses in the area.

The New York-side roadway was a dirt road to the village of Greenwood Lake and was the only highway out of the area. The road was impassible in bad weather and buses and trucks could not use it at all. Freidrich and his commission wanted that the railroad be replaced by a state highway on the New Jersey side from Hewitt to Sterling Forest. They also noted that the approval should be held off until the New Jersey State Highway Commission would approve it. With it, the stations at Sterling Forest, Awosting and Hewitt would also be abandoned, with approval of the New Jersey State Public Utilities Commission. The Public Utilities Commission noted that they also had a proposal for a road on the east side of Greenwood Lake. Freidrich also wanted a state highway on the New York side as well.

However, on June 1, members of the Morningside Country Club and several residents of Sterling Forest made an appeal to the Interstate Commerce Commission on their tentative approval of service abandonment. Their appeal came on the grounds that they needed the railroad for the delivery of needed supplies and the need for communication with people outside the area. They felt that the access to the hotel would be threatened and that the lack of railroad connections would drain the property value. The complaints of the Morningside Country Club would not shift the decision and agreed to the abandonment of service on September 30. They noted that the agreements were in place to construct road-based replacements.

Behrman noted in late June 1935 that they had no money for the construction of a new road and would ask the United States Government to help fund the construction of a new road. Behrman added that the road could also be built with unemployed workers who could use federal funding to create and grade the new roadway. The belief was that they could do it without the county spending any money and that in 1936 they could make further improvements with their own money so they could turn it over to the state for maintenance. On September 18, the county made an agreement to get money from the Works Progress Administration for the project. Their desire was to have the federal government spend the entire money for the project, which was to cost $288,968 (1935 USD). This new road would be 30 feet (9.1 m) wide and 4.5 miles (7.2 km) long. They believed that in order to construct the road it would require 300 men each month for a year.

Service north of Wanaque–Midvale ended on September 28, 1935 and the abandonment went into effect on September 30. After a delay by the Works Progress Administration in October, on November 16, President of the United States Franklin Delano Roosevelt agreed to fund the project with a grant of $227,945 from the Works Progress Administration. Behrman noted that he was happy that the President signed off on the project, noting yet again that 300 people would be employed for the job, including many who were unemployed due to the Great Depression.

=== Further service decline (1935–1966) ===
In mid-December 1949, two juveniles from Haskell broke into the Wanaque–Midvale station to get some money from the depot's safe. However, when they brought the safe to a gravel pit and broke it open with a hammer, they found lots of tickets and no money. Disappointed with the find, they took the numerous railroad tickets and threw them into the lake in the sandpit. Despite that, they were found and brought back to the station, where the railroad staff dried them out and sold them anyway. The police chief and a fellow officer brought the youths in for questioning on December 15, where they admitted their theft after six hours. They also admitted to breaking into cars in the area, something the police had suspected them doing as well.

On September 19, 1951, an explosion occurred at Allied Metals Corporation, a facility located near the station. Site of a fatal explosion on May 5, 1947 when wet sand was thrown on aluminum, the blast this time came from magnesium manufacturing they were doing as part of Korean War contracts. A pulverizing mill, which reduced the magnesium's size exploded and was leveled, knocking out another nearby building. The explosion rocked through the Midvale section of Wanaque, resulting in the depot losing most of its windows. The Dondero's Hotel, across the street from the station, also lost all of its windows in the explosion, along with several homes.

On October 17, 1960, service was taken over by a merged Erie-Lackawanna Railroad.

In 1962, as part of the proposal to eliminate railroad service through downtown Passaic, the Erie-Lackawanna Railroad proposed to use the Delaware, Lackawanna and Western Railroad's Boonton Branch for service to replace the Erie Railroad mainline through the city. As part of this, it would be proposed that the stretch of the New York and Greenwood Lake from Mountain View station in Wayne to Wanaque–Midvale station would become a shuttle service. In doing so, they would redo the junction at Mountain View to facilitate service. On July 1, 1963, it was officially announced that the Greenwood Lake and Boonton Branch would be merged at Mountain View, resulting an uptick in service. This change occurred on September 27, 1963.

In July 1964, the Erie Lackawanna began the process of requesting the elimination of a station agent at Wanaque–Midvale. They made the official request on July 23, stating that the depot did not have enough passengers to justify the continued employment of the agent. Thomas Hughes, a railroad telegraph operator, noted about the station only had 75 commuters on average. However, Hughes, the chairman of the Order of Railroad Telegraphers, noted that the station agent at Wanaque–Midvale was still a necessity, citing that the station was still used more often in winter than the 75 average. Also, he felt it was necessary because it was the terminal station of the branch and located on a track with numerous accidents. Charles Bowman, the station agent, was caught off guard and also said he had to report for 35 emergencies in 1963, the majority in winter. Hughes also noted that Bowman moved to the area to be ready in case of emergencies and that elimination of the position would increase the burden on the train crews. On July 22, the borough of Wanaque decided that Herbert Irwin, its local attorney, would be sent to Newark to protest the actions of the Erie Railroad, stating they made the decision after hearing Hughes' comments. The mayor of Wanaque, Harry Wolfe stated that he opposed the proposal himself. However, Wanaque–Midvale and six others proposed by the Erie-Lackawanna were held until they could determine whether or not the closing of the agencies would affect the staff in Hoboken Terminal.

=== Closure and fire (1966–1968) ===
On April 13, 1966, the borough of Wanaque noted that they wanted to the depot to be converted into a headquarters for the Wanaque Police Department. Stating that they could get the depot cheap to replace its then-current facility, Warren Hagstrom, the police chairman, stated that it would be beneficial for the seven office police force. The old facility was a cramped one without room for various files and records, despite multiple renovations. The station depot had a good parking lot for the police and its location just off County Route 511 would make accessibility easy. Wolff authorized the new borough attorney, Nathan Bernstein, to inquire with the railroad about purchasing the 50 by 30 feet (15.2 m × 9.1 m) depot.

In late July 1966, the Wanaque Board of Education offered to purchase some of the land from the Erie Lackawanna for $85,000. This offer would be to help open a new elementary school in Wanaque with the hope that the new school would open in September 1968. The Board noted that the elementary schools in Haskell and Midvale were both overloaded in enrollment and that they needed a new school. The railroad responded in August that they would be interested in the offer to sell the 20 acres (8.1 ha) stretch of land for construction. However, the Board noted that they needed an answer within 30 days after August 30, 1966.

On September 28, 1966, the Borough Council agreed to purchase the station depot for $100, with a $25 per year lease on the land. The council noted that they agreed to a long-term lease for the police department to use the building. It was believed that the depot would have been razed if not purchased and would be renovated. That night, the Borough Council showed interest in the railroad right-of-way about building an alternate to County Route 511 for a road as service was expected to end after October 3, 1966.

Railroad service of the shuttle between Wanaque–Midvale and Mountain View ended on September 30, 1966. Martin Munson, a Wanaque resident and Erie Lackawanna engineer, brought the final train into the station at 8:30 p.m.

The discontinuation of service also resulted in a problem with the borough's purchase of the depot. A lawsuit was filed to the New Jersey State Superior Court to force railroad service to resume on the line and the railroad, who was ready to sell, could not continue with the purchase until the lawsuit was adjudicated. When the railroad discontinued service, it also turned off the floodlights at the turntable, resulting in several streets becoming pitch black at night. Wolfe requested that the board approve funding for lights on the darkened streets.

However, the purchase never occurred and the station stood vacant, as it had since 1965. On December 4, 1967, the station depot caught fire around 2:20 p.m. Authorities managed to get the 40 feet (12 m)-high fire out by 4:00 p.m., but was unable to save the building, which was gutted on one side from the flames. Flames had also caught nearby railroad ties on fire.

By December 1967, the railroad had not given the Wanaque Board of Education an agreement about the property for a new elementary school. In October, there had been another resolution that if the railroad did not hurry up, they would have to look elsewhere. Martin Verp, the attorney for the Board, was authorized to call the railroad at the Cleveland, Ohio offices, to see if get an answer.

In March 1968, the railroad told Verp that they were ready to sell the property for the new elementary school, pending approval of their Board of Directors. Verp stated that he was told there would likely be no opposition to the decision. Verp stated that the Board should move to hire an architect to get designs of the new school started.

== Bibliography ==
- Baxter, Raymond J.; Adams, Arthur G. (1999). Railroad Ferries of the Hudson: And Stories of a Deckhand. Fordham, New York: Fordham University Press. ISBN 9780823219544.
- Erie Railroad (1902). Seventh Annual Report of the Board of Directors of the Erie Railroad Company to the Bond and Share Holders Fiscal Year Ending June 30, 1902. New York, New York: Chas B. Reed.
- Interstate Commerce Commission (1936). Reports and Decisions of the Interstate Commerce Commission of the United States Volume 207. Washington D.C.: United States Government Printing Office.
- Minor, George H. (1912). The Erie System: A Statement of Various Facts Relating to the Organization and Corporate History of the Various Companies which Either Directly Or Indirectly are Now Or Have Heretofore Been Owned, Leased, Operated Or Controlled by Erie Railroad Company and Its Predecessor Companies, 1911. William Garrison Company.
- New Jersey State Board of Taxes and Assessment (1922). Seventh Annual Report of the State Board of Taxes and Assessment. Trenton, New Jersey: State of New Jersey.
- United States Congress (1962). Hearings Before a Subcommittee of the Committee on Banking and Currency; United States Senate Eighty-Seventh Congress Second Session on Bills to Authorize the Housing and Home Finance Agency to Provide Additional Assistance for the Development of Mass Transportation Systems and for Other Purposes. Washington D.C.: United States Government Printing Office.
- Whittemore, Henry (1894). History of Montclair Township, State of New Jersey: Including the History of Families who Have Been Identified with Its Growth and Prosperity. New York, New York: The Suburban Publishing Company.
