= Mountain View station (NJ Transit) =

NJ Transit rail station

Mountain View–Wayne
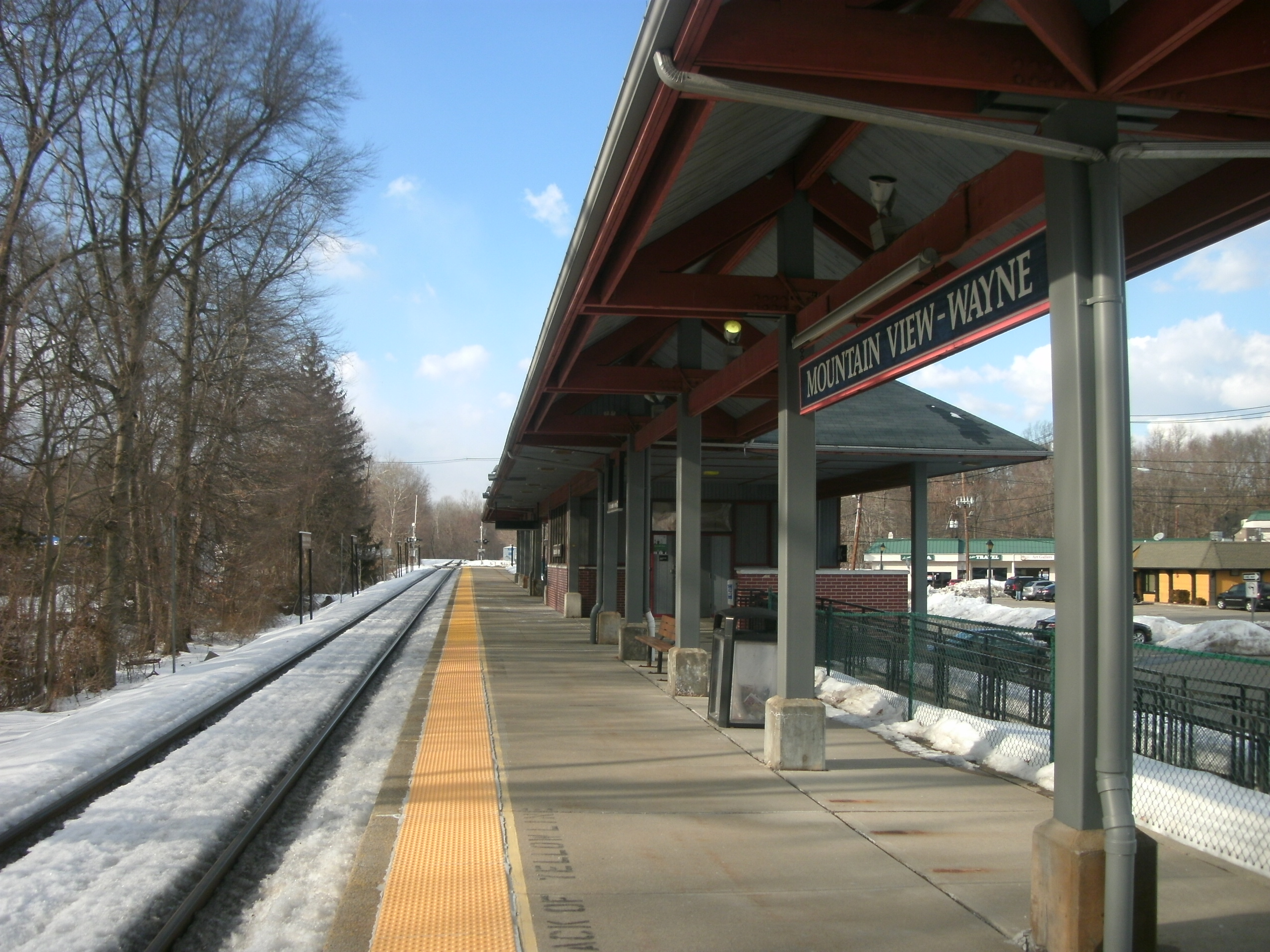
- Mountain View station facing northbound at the station canopy. The grade crossing with U.S. Route 202 is visible in the distance.

General information
- Location: 40 Erie Avenue, Wayne, New Jersey 07470
- Coordinates: 40°54′50″N 74°16′03″W
- Owner: NJ Transit
- Platforms: 1 side platform
- Tracks: 1
- Connections: NJT Bus: 871

Construction
- Accessible: yes

Other information
- Station code: 1773 (Erie Railroad)
- Fare zone: 9

History
- Opened: January 1, 1873
- Rebuilt: 1963; June 19, 1989–February 7, 1990
- Electrified: Not electrified

Key dates
- August 1981: Station agent eliminated

Passengers
- 2025: 34 (average weekday)
- Rank: 146 of 153

Services
Preceding station	NJ Transit	Following station
Lincoln Park toward Hackettstown	Montclair–Boonton Line limited service	Wayne Route 23 toward New York or Hoboken
Former services
Preceding station	Erie Railroad	Following station
Wayne toward Sterling Forest	New York and Greenwood Lake Railway	Singac toward Jersey City
Location

Mountain View, signed on the platform as Mountain View–Wayne, is a station on the Montclair–Boonton Line of NJ Transit in Wayne, New Jersey. Prior to the Montclair Connection in 2002, the station was served by the Boonton Line. The station is located on Erie Avenue, just off of U.S. Route 202 and Route 23 in downtown Wayne. Since January 2008, Mountain View station is one of two stations in Wayne, the other being the Wayne Route 23 Transit Center, a station off the Westbelt interchange.

== History ==
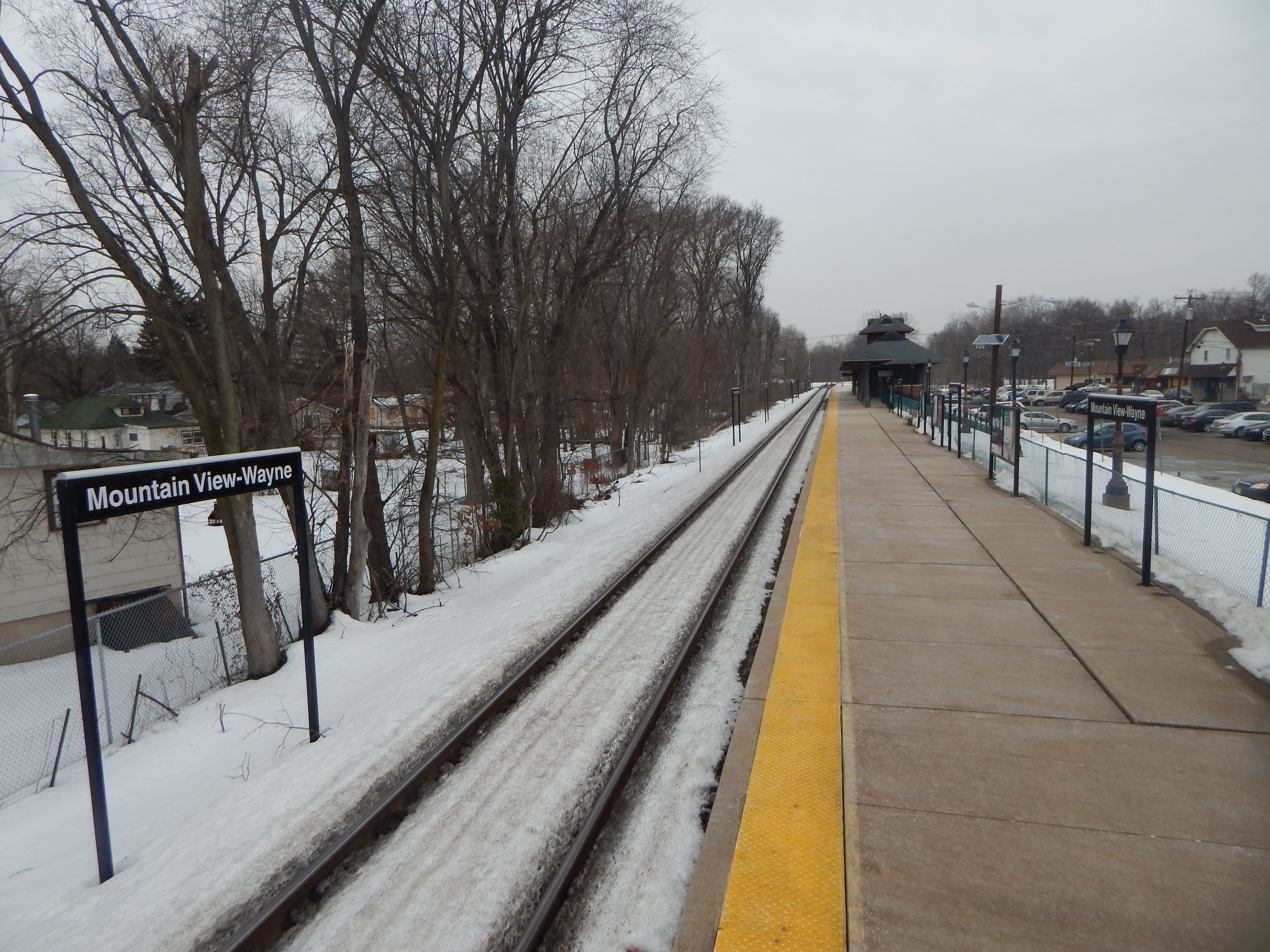
The Mountain View station facing northbound from the high-level platform

The Mountain View station was one of two stations in Wayne built on the New York and Greenwood Lake Railway, run by the Erie Railroad. The line ran from the Erie's Pavonia Terminal in Jersey City to Sterling Forest station on the New Jersey–New York state line. There was a second station constructed in Wayne, north of Mountain View at the Ryerson Avenue crossing. In 1935, train service was cut back to the Wanaque–Midvale station in Wanaque, New Jersey. After the Erie Railroad and Delaware, Lackawanna and Western Railroad merged in October 1960, plans started in 1963 to abandon the former Lackawanna Boonton Branch, a freight railroad built in 1869. This line also had a second Mountain View station. That year, the Erie-Lackawanna Railroad tied the Boonton Line and Greenwood Lake lines together at Mountain View Junction. The portion of the Boonton Branch east of the junction was abandoned and the Greenwood Lake line was reduced to shuttle service north of Mountain View.

At that time, the wooden station depot at Mountain View built by the Erie was demolished and replaced by an Armco metal building on the platform, which boasted two tracks. One track served as the new Boonton Line, which turned westward to Lincoln Park. The other track served as the transfer for the now Wanaque-Midvale shuttle, serving the old Greenwood Lake line north of Mountain View, including the Ryerson Avenue station. The shuttle service was discontinued in October 1966, along with the Ryerson Avenue station. The track was torn up south of Pequannock Township; as a result, the station shelter and canopy resides on the old shuttle track. The track redirected onto the Boonton Branch is still in use and is the lone track through Mountain View.

== Station layout and services ==
The station has one low-level side platform for the lone revenue service track. Mountain View is accessible for handicapped persons under the Americans with Disabilities Act of 1990. Bike lockers and a ticket vending machine are available.

Mountain View station has a large station complex, consisting of four parking lots maintained by New Jersey Transit totaling up to 389 parking spaces, eight of which are handicap-accessible. The first of these lots is the main station lot, which has 228 parking spaces on Erie Avenue. All eight handicap spaces are located in that lot. The second lot has seventeen spaces located at Williams Street and Greenwood Avenue. A third lot is also located on this block, consisting of 26 spaces. A fourth and final parking lot is present on Greenwood Avenue near Route 23, which makes up the final 118 spaces. There is no parking fee for any of the four lots. The station receives bus service from the 871 route, which was one of the Morris County Metro lines.

No weekend service is provided to Mountain View, as Montclair-Boonton Line weekend service ends at Bay Street station in Montclair. However, the six special holiday trains that run to Lake Hopatcong station do stop at Mountain View.

== Bibliography ==
- Baxter, Raymond J.; Adams, Arthur G. (1999). Railroad Ferries of the Hudson: And Stories of a Deckhand. Fordham, New York: Fordham University Press. ISBN 9780823219544.
- Catlin, George L. (1873). Homes on the Montclair Railway, for New York Business Men. A Description of the Country Adjacent to the Montclair Railway, Between Jersey City and Greenwood Lake. New York, New York: Montclair Railway Company.
- Whittemore, Henry (1894). History of Montclair Township, State of New Jersey: Including the History of Families who Have Been Identified with Its Growth and Prosperity. New York, New York: The Suburban Publishing Company.
