= List of shipwrecks in March 1830 =

The list of shipwrecks in March 1830 includes ships sunk, foundered, grounded, or otherwise lost during March 1830.

== 2 March ==
List of shipwrecks: 2 March 1830
Ship	State	Description
Prosperity	United Kingdom	The ship was wrecked at Wexford.

== 4 March ==
List of shipwrecks: 4 March 1830
Ship	State	Description
Cumberland	United Kingdom	The ship struck a rock and foundered in the Pacific Ocean 150 nautical miles (280 km) south of Fremantle, Swan River Colony. She was on a voyage from Sydney, New South Wales to Fremantle and Bombay, India.
Frau Catharina	(Denmark) Duchy of Holstein	The ship sprang a leak in the North Sea and sank off the Dogger Bank. Her crew were rescued by a fishing smack. She was on a voyage from Grimsby, Lincolnshire to Tönning.
Hiram	(United Kingdom of Great Britain and Ireland) British North America	The ship was lost on the Nantucket Shoals. She was on a voyage from St. John's, Newfoundland to Rio de Janeiro, Brazil.
Kate	United Kingdom	The ship was wrecked on the Gunfleet sand, in the North Sea off the coast of Essex. Her crew were rescued. She was on a voyage from South Shields, County Durham to London.

== 6 March ==
List of shipwrecks: 6 March 1830
Ship	State	Description
L'Aigle or Eagle	United Kingdom	The whaler was wrecked at Tongatapu, Tonga Islands. Her crew were rescued, and carried to Sydney by Tranmere

== 7 March ==
List of shipwrecks: 7 March 1830
Ship	State	Description
Commerce	United Kingdom	The ship was wrecked on the Skull Martin Rock, in the Irish Sea off Ballywalter, County Down. She was on a voyage from Workington, Cumberland to Dublin.
Louisa Sophia	Netherlands	The ship struck a sunken wreck and foundered in the North Sea off Scheveningen, South Holland.

== 8 March ==
List of shipwrecks: 8 March 1830
Ship	State	Description
Huskisson	United Kingdom	The ship was wrecked at Ballyshannon, County Donegal.

== 9 March ==
List of shipwrecks: 9 March 1830
Ship	State	Description
Elizabeth	Netherlands	The ship capsized at Ramsgate, Kent, United Kingdom.
Maid of Morven	United Kingdom	The paddle steamer capsized and sank at Oban, Argyllshire. She was later refloated, repaired and returned to service.
Sally	United Kingdom	The ship was wrecked in Dundrum Bay. She was on a voyage from Maryport, Cumberland to Dublin.

== 10 March ==
List of shipwrecks: 10 March 1830
Ship	State	Description
Jane	United Kingdom	The ship was wrecked in the Bay of Bulls. Her crew were rescued. She was on a voyage from Greenock, Renfrewshire to Newfoundland, British North America.
Kitty	United Kingdom	The ship foundered in the Irish Sea off Workington, Cumberland.
HMS Wolf	Royal Navy	The sloop-of-war was driven ashore and severely damaged near Portsmouth, Hampshire.

== 11 March ==
List of shipwrecks: 11 March 1830
Ship	State	Description
Henrick	United Kingdom	The ship was wrecked on the Manoel Luez Rocks. Her crew were rescued. She was on a voyage from Maranhão to Bahia, Brazil.

== 12 March ==
List of shipwrecks: 12 March 1830
Ship	State	Description
Charlotte	United Kingdom	The ship was wrecked at Matamoros, Tamaulipas, Mexico. She was on a voyage from Liverpool, Lancashire to Matamoros.
Mary	United Kingdom	The ship was wrecked at South Shields, County Durham. Her crew were rescued.

== 13 March ==
List of shipwrecks: 13 March 1830
Ship	State	Description
Caldicott Castle	United Kingdom	The ship foundered in the Bristol Channel off Steep Holm. Her crew were rescued. She was on a voyage from Newport, Monmouthshire to Bridgwater, Somerset.
Edward	United Kingdom	The ship capsized in the River Thames with the loss of all but one of her crew. She was on a voyage from Harwich, Essex to London.

== 15 March ==
List of shipwrecks: 15 March 1830
Ship	State	Description
Fortuna	Hamburg	The ship was wrecked on the Witsand. She was on a voyage from Bahia, Brazil to Hamburg.

== 16 March ==
List of shipwrecks: 16 March 1830
Ship	State	Description
Despatch	United Kingdom	The ship foundered in the Irish Sea off Point Lynas, Anglesey. She was on a voyage from Holyhead, Anglesey to Liverpool, Lancashire.
Frolic	United Kingdom	The schooner-rigged paddle steamer foundered in the Bristol Channel with the loss of about 80 lives. She was on a voyage from Tenby, Pembrokeshire to Bristol, Gloucestershire.^{[Note 1]}
Leefde	Netherlands	The ship sank in the North Holland Canal. She was on a voyage from Amsterdam, North Holland to London, United Kingdom.
Nelson	United Kingdom	The ship was wrecked near Bamburgh, Northumberland. She was on a voyage from London to Leith, Lothian.
Return	United Kingdom	The ship was wrecked on the Shorstone Scars. She was on a voyage from London to Leith.

== 17 March ==
List of shipwrecks: 17 March 1830
Ship	State	Description
Elizabeth	(United Kingdom of Great Britain and Ireland) British North America	The ship departed from St. John's, Newfoundland for Halifax, Nova Scotia. No further trace, presumed foundered with the loss of all hands.

== 18 March ==
List of shipwrecks: 18 March 1830
Ship	State	Description
Christian	Netherlands	The ship was driven ashore in the Maas. She was on a voyage from Rotterdam, South Holland to Liverpool, Lancashire, United Kingdom.

== 26 March ==
List of shipwrecks: 26 March 1830
Ship	State	Description
Allan	United Kingdom	The ship was wrecked on "Point le Praulx", British North America. All on board were rescued. She was on a voyage from the Clyde to Saint John, New Brunswick, British North America.
George Henry	United Kingdom	The ship was driven ashore and wrecked at Liverpool, Nova Scotia, British North America.
Meridian	United States	The ship was driven ashore and wrecked at Barrington, Nova Scotia, British North America. She was on a voyage from Boston, Massachusetts to Halifax, Nova Scotia.
Nautilus	United Kingdom	The ship was driven ashore and wrecked at Liverpool, Nova Scotia.

== 27 March ==
List of shipwrecks: 27 March 1830
Ship	State	Description
Tructeaux	France	The ship was wrecked near "Plencin". She was on a voyage from Santander, Spain to Brest, Finistère.

== 29 March ==
List of shipwrecks: 29 March 1830
Ship	State	Description
Arkwright	United Kingdom	The ship was driven ashore in Widewall Bay. She was on a voyage from Aberdeen to Savannah, Georgia, United States.
San Jacoba de Galicia	Spain	The ship was wrecked at Punta Maternillos, Cuba. She was on a voyage from Havana, Cuba to A Coruña.

== Unknown date ==
List of shipwrecks: Unknown date 1830
Ship	State	Description
Amiable Louise	France	The brig was wrecked near Ceuta, Spain before 21 March. Her crew survived. She was on a voyage from Marseille, Bouches-du-Rhône to A Coruña, Spain.
Anna Sophia	Hamburg	The ship was wrecked on the Pagen Sand before 24 March. She was on a voyage from Curaçao to Hamburg.
Prince Metternich	Austrian Empire	The ship was wrecked near Smyrna, Ottoman Empire.
Providence	United Kingdom	The ship was wrecked in the Dardanelles before 10 March, She was on a voyage from Cardiff, Glamorgan to Constantinople, Ottoman Empire.
Speculator	(United Kingdom of Great Britain and Ireland) New South Wales	The schooner was wrecked in the Five Islands.

== Notes ==
1. Date may have been 16 March 1831.
