= Wreck of the Seladon =

1896 shipwreck in the Pacific Ocean

Coordinates: 5°38′04.5″S 155°56′02.7″W

Seladon (1876/77–1896)
- Gouache painting of the Seladon (1889) by Halvor Mikkelsen, produced for Captain Thorsen

History

Norway
- Name: Seladon
- Namesake: Norwegian for "celadon"
- Owner: Thomas Scheen Falck, Sr. (1876–1878); Gustav Gundersen (1878–1896)
- Operator: Mons Wiig (1877–1880; 1883–1886); Thomas Eriksen (1880–1883); Oluf Dorius Sanne Møller (1886–1888); Th. Thorsen (1888–1892); Adolf Emil Jæger (1892–1896)
- Port of registry: Stavanger, Norway
- Ordered: 1876
- Builder: Jørgensen & Knudsen (Holmen)
- Completed: 1877
- Out of service: 7 August 1896
- Identification: Call sign: JLVP
- Fate: Ran aground on Starbuck Island

General characteristics
- Class & type: Three-masted full-rigger (1877–1894); Three-masted barque (1894–1896)
- Tonnage: 1,102 GRT, 1,066 NRT
- Length: Claim 1: 177 feet (54 m); Claim 2: 189.4 feet (57.7 m)
- Beam: Claim 1: 36 feet (11 m); Claim 2: 38.8 feet (11.8 m)
- Depth: Claim 1: 21 feet (6.4 m); Claim 2: 21.8 feet (6.6 m)
- Propulsion: Sails
- Crew: 16 men

The wreck of the Seladon, a Norwegian barque from Stavanger, occurred on the night of 7 August 1896, when the ship ran aground on the reef of Starbuck Island. The crew had embarked from Newcastle on 13 July 1896, and were en route to Honolulu. Following the wreckage, the crew of the ship sailed in lifeboats for nearly a month until they landed on Niulakita, then known as Sophia Island. They lived with contracted Rotuman inhabitants of the island for just over 10 months before being rescued.

== Background ==
=== Ship history and measurements ===
The Seladon was built as a wooden three-masted full-rigger by the Jørgensen & Knudsen shipyard on the island of Holmen, in the port city of Drammen. The ship was ordered in 1876 by Thomas Scheen Falck, Sr. of Stavanger (father of Hans Lindahl Falck), and construction was completed in 1877. It was purchased in 1878 by Gustav Gundersen, also of Stavanger. It had a gross register tonnage of 1102 and a net register tonnage of 1066. It was converted from a full-rigger to a barque in 1894. The dimensions of the ship vary slightly in reports; by one account, it measured 177 ft × 36 ft × 21 ft (53.9 m × 11.0 m × 6.4 m), and by another it measured 189.4 ft × 38.8 ft × 21.8 ft (57.7 m × 11.8 m × 6.6 m).

Mønstringsjournal entries (similar to shipping articles) from 1883–1893 indicate prior journeys to Amsterdam, Cardiff, and London. The crew was typically transporting coal.

The name of the ship is a Norwegian term that is cognate with English celadon, both from French céladon, named after the character Céladon in the novel L'Astrée.

=== Islands ===
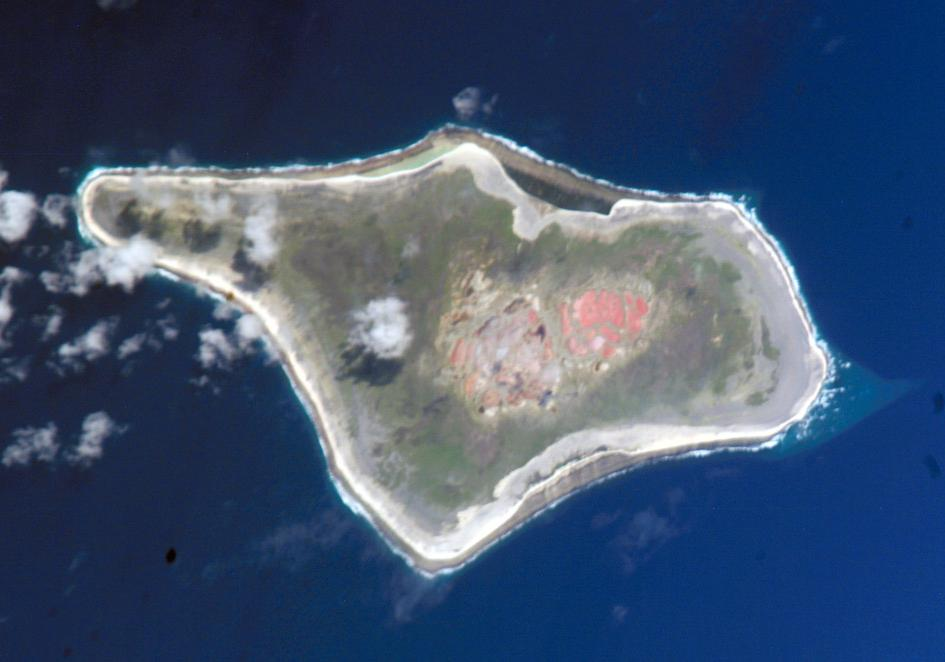
Satellite image of Starbuck Island

At the time of the wreckage, Starbuck Island was recently deserted, after having been a major guano deposit and mine for over two decades. It was not habitable, and remains uninhabited in present-day; the island lacks freshwater and has little vegetation. It was poorly charted, and other shipwrecks on the island were known to have occurred in the years prior to the fate of the Seladon. Starbuck Island is approximately 3,850 miles (6,200 km) northeast of Newcastle and 1,870 miles (3,010 km) south of Honolulu.

The trip to Honolulu would have landed the crew in the short-lived Republic of Hawaii, which existed from 1894–1898. Honolulu is approximately 5,010 miles (8,060 km) northeast of Newcastle.

== Wreckage ==
The Seladon's crew of 16 men, led by Captain Adolf Emil Jæger, cast off from Newcastle on 13 July 1896, bound for Honolulu and carrying a full cargo of coal; the journey was expected to take 40 to 80 days.

For the first several weeks, the journey to Honolulu was largely uneventful, and weather conditions were stable. A letter from the crew is quoted as stating: "Each day we sailed with a hope of a fast journey to Honolulu, but man [proposes] and God [disposes]". On the night of 7 August 1896, the Seladon met its ultimate demise, and ran aground the shallow western barrier of Starbuck Island at a speed of 7 knots (8.1 mph; 13 km/h).

The crew initially tried to reverse and break the ship free by adjusting the rig, but it did not give way. They reported that it was filled with four feet of water within fifteen minutes, and therefore they did not have time to grab clothing or much gear, able to salvage only a few provisions, (Note: "[...] a small keg of water, a 1/2 sack of bread, canned goods, meat, salmon and sardines [...]") a map, and a compass. The crew remained in lifeboats overnight.

== Aftermath ==
=== Post-wreck voyage ===
The morning after the wreckage, the crew split off into two lifeboats of eight members each. They set a course for Malden Island, approximately 130 miles (210 km) northeast of the wreck site on Starbuck Island, but missed it; the crew attributed the miscalculation to the loss of their navigation tools (such as the sextant) in the wreckage, being left with only a map and compass. They then changed course, aiming for Kiritimati (Christmas Island), approximately 420 miles (680 km) northwest of Malden Island, but again missed. The crew then sailed with the currents for the next several days, but on 18 August 1896, Captain Jæger's gig capsized. Chief officer Kristian Neilsen drowned, but all other crew members were picked up by the second boat.

Captain Jæger died of exhaustion on 24 August 1896, and the crew threw his body into the water; he had been suffering from tuberculosis when the Seladon departed. The crew remained drifting at sea with no sight of land for weeks, and their food and water supplies dwindled.

=== Sophia Island ===
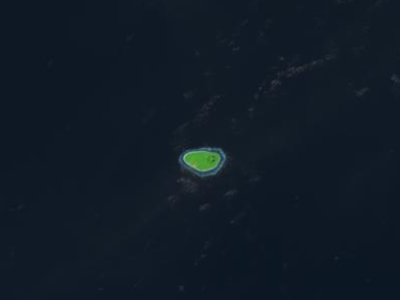
Satellite image of Niulakita (Sophia Island)

On 5 or 6 September 1896, one month after the wreckage of the Seladon, the crew spotted Sophia Island (Niulakita), approximately 1,720 miles (2,770 km) southwest of Starbuck Island; they drove into the island's reef, casting themselves ashore. They were met on the shore by Rotuman inhabitants of the island, two brothers – Dick, who went by the nickname Dill, and his older brother Belly (Note: Later called Tiki and Penne, respectively, by present-day inhabitants of the island.) – and their families, totaling ten people, with whom the Norwegians subsequently lived amongst for just over 10 months. They survived on bananas, coconuts, seabirds, and turtles, all of which were in abundance on the island.

The Rotumans were hired by the owner of the island, Samoan-based American businessman Harry Jay Moors (father of Harry William Moors), to take care of the island and prepare it for banana cultivation; they had resided there for over eight years. There had previously been over 60 workers on the island, but the majority had departed a few months prior to the arrival of the Norwegians, and the brothers and their families were the only group to stay behind. Given their employment, they spoke some English, and were therefore able to communicate with the castaway crew.

==== Deaths on the island ====
On 14 September 1896, ship carpenter Tollak Olsen Vestbø died from exposure accrued during the voyage. On 25 October 1896, Dill, the younger of the two Rotuman brothers, died of an infection.

=== Rescue ===
The 13 surviving crewmates upon their return to Stavanger in 1897

On 17 July 1897, around 10 1/2 months after they had landed on Sophia Island, the remaining crew of 13 was rescued by the passing steamer Clyde of Suva, led by Captain Callaghan. They were taken back to Fiji, then transferred onto another ship to Sydney. In late October 1897, the crew returned to London, from whence they originally boarded the Seladon nearly two years prior.

== Legacy ==
Both in Stavanger and on Niulakita, the story endures in the memories of present-day locals:

- In 1968, the street Seladons Vei ('Seladon's Way') on Hundvåg in Stavanger was named after the ship.
- In 2001, Stavanger filmmaker Gjert Meling announced a documentary that was five years in the making about the castaway crew's journey, titled Reisen til Sofia ('The Journey to Sophia'). A grant was awarded for the film in 2002. During production, Meling visited Niulakita, and locals were able to bring him to the still-standing gravestone of Tollak Olsen.

== Bibliography ==
- Hviding, Edvard (2015) [2014]. "7: Norwegian Shipping and Landfall in the South Sea in the Age of Sail". In Alsaker Kjerland, Kirsten; Enge Bertelsen, Bjørn (eds.). Navigating Colonial Orders: Norwegian Entrepreneurship in Africa and Oceania. New York, Oxford: Berghahn Books. pp. 173–186. doi:10.1515/9781782385400-011. ISBN 978-1-78238-540-0.
- Rege, Wincent; Rege, Malvin; Rege, Eli (2012). The Wreck of the Seladon: A True Survival on an Island Story. CreateSpace. ISBN 978-1-4700-0245-9.
- Skadberg, Gunnar (March 1998). "Caspar Wignæs – en ukjent Stavangerforfatter med røtter i Finnøy" [Caspar Wignæs – an unknown Stavanger author with roots in Finnøy] (PDF). Stavangeren (in Norwegian Bokmål). 8 (1). Byhistorisk Forening Stavanger. ISSN 0806-184X.
- "The Seladon Disaster: Further Particulars. Two Thousand Miles in an Open Boat". The Colonist. Vol. 40, no. 8951. Nelson, NZ. 25 August 1897. p. 2.
- "Story of the Sea: Missing Bark Seladon. Wrecked on Starbuck Island. Sufferings of the Crew. Castaways for ten months. Three men dead". Launceston Examiner. Vol. 57, no. 203. Launceston, TAS, AU. 28 August 1897. p. 14.
- "An Island Wreck: Loss of the Barque Seladon Death of the Captain and Two Men. Ten Months on an Island. Survivors Arrive at Fiji". Auckland Star. Vol. 28, no. 205. Auckland, NZ. 2 September 1897. p. 8.
- "Wreck of the Bark Seladon: Her Survivors Have a Terrible Experience at Sea. Almost Dead When Picked Up by Natives of Sophia Islands". The Record-Union. Vol. 94, no. 34. Sacramento, CA, US. 24 September 1897. p. 1.
- "Wrecked in South Seas: Survivors of the Norwegian Bark Seladon Reach London After Months of Hardship. Cast Up on a Coral Island". The New York Times. Vol. 47, no. 14409. New York, NY, US. 24 October 1897. p. 5.
- Skretting, Tommas Torgersen (3 December 2001). "«Seladon»- filmen vel i havn". Stavanger Aftenblad (in Norwegian Bokmål). Stavanger, Norway.
- "På an igjen for Orvung og Nielsen". Stavanger Aftenblad (in Norwegian Bokmål). Stavanger, Norway. 25 April 2002.
- Pahr-Iversen, Engwall (22 April 2021). "Ordfører roet ned kamp om gatenavn". Dagsavisen (in Norwegian Bokmål). Oslo, Norway.
- Rege, Wincent (February 2013) [October 2012]. "Expedition "Seladon II"" (PDF). rotuma.net.
- Torstrup, Ole Christian. "Seladon". O. C. Torstrups sjøfolk arkiv (in Norwegian Bokmål).
- "Seladon (1876)". DigitaltMuseum (in English and Norwegian Bokmål). Norway.
- "Seladon (1876) Full-rigged ship". KulturNav (in English and Norwegian Bokmål).
- "Seladon (STG135187703)". Skipshistorie (in English and Norwegian Bokmål). Norway.
- "SV Seladon (+1896)". Wrecksite. Belgium.
