= Euryale (disambiguation) =

Euryale was a Gorgon in Greek mythology.

Euryale may also refer to:

== Greek mythology ==
- Euryale, daughter of Minos and possible mother of Orion
- Euryale, one of the Amazons
- Euryale, possible wife of Minyas

== Biology ==
- Euryale ferox, a species of aquatic plant
- Euryale (plant), a genus of aquatic plants
- Euryale (echinoderm), a genus of echinoderm

== Ships ==
- French brig Euryale (1863)
- USS Euryale (AS-22)

== See also ==
- Evryali, a piano piece by Iannis Xenakis
- List of ships named Euryale
- Euryale, list of Greek characters by that name
