= List of shipwrecks in June 1823 =

The list of shipwrecks in June 1823 includes all ships sunk, foundered, grounded, or otherwise lost during June 1823.

== 1 June ==
List of shipwrecks: 1 June 1823
| Ship | State | Description |
|---|---|---|
| Grove | United Kingdom | The ship was lost on Grand Cayman Island. She was on a voyage from Havana, Cuba, to Veracruz, Mexico. |
| Molly & Peggy | (United Kingdom of Great Britain and Ireland) Isle of Man | The smack was driven ashore and wrecked near "Saltam", Cumberland. |
| Shibboleth | United States | The ship was captured by pirates in the Bay of Campeche. She was set afire and sunk. |

== 2 June ==
List of shipwrecks: 2 June 1823
| Ship | State | Description |
|---|---|---|
| Hope | United Kingdom | The ship was wrecked on the north-east point of Cape Sable Island, British North America, with the loss of 4 lives. She was on a voyage from Belfast, County Antrim, to Saint John, New Brunswick, British North America. |
| London Packet | United Kingdom | The ship was driven ashore and wrecked at Bideford, Devon. Her crew were rescued. She was on a voyage from Tobago to Bristol, Gloucestershire. |

== 3 June ==
List of shipwrecks: 3 June 1823
| Ship | State | Description |
|---|---|---|
| Dundee Packed | United Kingdom | The ship was driven ashore at Hellevoet, South Holland, Netherlands. Her crew were rescued by a pilot boat. She was on a voyage from Newcastle upon Tyne, Northumberland, to Rotterdam, South Holland. |
| Wanderer | United States | The ship was wrecked on the Double-headed Shot Key, in the Caribbean Sea. All on board were rescued. |

== 4 June ==
List of shipwrecks: 4 June 1823
| Ship | State | Description |
|---|---|---|
| Hope | United Kingdom | The ship was driven ashore on Cape Sable Island, Nova Scotia, British North America, with the loss of five lives. She was on a voyage from Belfast, County Antrim, to St. Andrew, New Brunswick, British North America. |
| Marshall Wellington | United Kingdom | The ship was driven ashore on Cape Sable Island with the loss of a crew member. |
| Regard | United Kingdom | The ship ran aground in the Kentish Knock, in the North Sea and was abandoned by her crew, who were rescued by the fishing smack Transit (United Kingdom). |

== 8 June ==
List of shipwrecks: 8 June 1823
| Ship | State | Description |
|---|---|---|
| Aurora | Chile | The ship was driven ashore and wrecked at Point Callao, Cruz de Reyes, with the loss of all hands. |
| Canada | United States | The brig was driven ashore at Cruz de Reyes. |
| Charles | United States | The ship was driven ashore at Cruz de Reyes. |
| Curimon | Chile | The ship was driven ashore and wrecked at Point Callao with the loss of all hands. |
| Echo | United States | The brig was driven ashore and wrecked at Cruz de Reyes. |
| Fortuna | Chile | The schooner was driven ashore and wrecked at "Almendad". |
| Hugh Cranford | Chile | The ship was severely damaged in the Bay of Valparaíso. |
| Isabel | Chile | The schooner was driven ashore and wrecked at "Almendad". |
| Laura | India | The ship was driven ashore and wrecked at "Almendad". Her crew were rescued. |
| Lautaro | Chile | The ship suffered severe damage when she collided with the frigate O'Higgins (Chilean Navy) in the Bay of Paraíso during a gale. |
| Lion | United States | The full-rigged ship was driven ashore at Cruz de Reyes. |
| Mary | United Kingdom | The full-rigged ship was driven ashore and wrecked at Cruz de Reyes. |
| Mary | United States | The brig was driven ashore at Cruz de Reyes. |
| Mexicana | Chile | The ship was driven ashore and wrecked at Point Callao with the loss of all but one of her crew. |
| O'Higgins | Chilean Navy | The frigate suffered severe damage when she collided with the ship Lautaro (Chile) in the Bay of Paraíso during a gale. |
| Peruana | Chile | The ship was driven ashore and wrecked at "Almendad". |
| Santa Rita | Chile | The brig was driven ashore and wrecked at "Almendad". |

== 9 June ==
List of shipwrecks: 9 June 1823
| Ship | State | Description |
|---|---|---|
| Bella Dolores | Spain | The ship, which had been captured by the privateer Centella (Gran Colombia), was wrecked on Key Caicos. |

== 10 June ==
List of shipwrecks: 10 June 1823
| Ship | State | Description |
|---|---|---|
| Bolton | United Kingdom | The ship sank in the Nepisiguit River. She was later refloated and repaired. |
| Freetown | United Kingdom | The ship was lost at St. Jago, Jamaica. |

== 11 June ==
List of shipwrecks: 11 June 1823
| Ship | State | Description |
|---|---|---|
| Desalaberry | (United Kingdom of Great Britain and Ireland) British North America | The steamboat was destroyed by fire. |
| Valdivia | Chilean Navy | The frigate foundered at Valparaíso. |

== 12 June ==
List of shipwrecks: 12 June 1823
| Ship | State | Description |
|---|---|---|
| Candidate | United Kingdom | The brig was driven ashore and wrecked at Rio de Janeiro, Brazil. Her crew survived. |
| Shannon | United Kingdom | The brig, which had sprung a leak on 30 May, foundered in the Atlantic Ocean on or about 12 June. She was on a voyage from Rio de Janeiro, Brazil, to London. |

== 13 June ==
List of shipwrecks: 13 June 1823
| Ship | State | Description |
|---|---|---|
| Amor Constante | Spain | The ship was wrecked at Montevideo, Brazil, with the loss of four of her crew. |

== 14 June ==
List of shipwrecks: 14 June 1823
| Ship | State | Description |
|---|---|---|
| Maids of Hull | United Kingdom | The ship was driven ashore near Helsingør, Denmark. She was later refloated and resumed her voyage. |
| Marshall Wellington | United Kingdom | The ship was wrecked on the north-east point of Cape Sable Island, British North America, with the loss of one life. She was on a voyage from Sunderland, County Durham, to Boston, Massachusetts, United States. |

== 16 June ==
List of shipwrecks: 16 June 1823
| Ship | State | Description |
|---|---|---|
| Robert | United Kingdom | The ship ran aground off Domesnes, Norway. She was abandoned by her crew on 22 June. Robert was on a voyage from London to Riga, Russia. |
| Swallow | United Kingdom | The ship was lost on the James & Mary Sand, in the Hooghly River, India, with some loss of Life. |

== 17 June ==
List of shipwrecks: 17 June 1823
| Ship | State | Description |
|---|---|---|
| Neilson | United Kingdom | The ship was wrecked at "Tobasco". |

== 20 June ==
List of shipwrecks: 20 June 1823
| Ship | State | Description |
|---|---|---|
| Nymphen | Denmark | The ship sprang a leak off Bengal, India. All on board were rescued by the pilot boat Mattress ( India). Nymphen was on a voyage from Copenhagen to Pondicherry, India. |
| Prince | Denmark | The full-rigged ship foundered off "Beladore", India. Her crew were rescued by a pilot boat. |
| San Domingo | United Kingdom | The ship was lost on the east point of Prince Edward Island, British North America. All on board were rescued. She was on a voyage from Waterford to Charlotte Town, North Carolina, United States. |

== 21 June ==
List of shipwrecks: 21 June 1823
| Ship | State | Description |
|---|---|---|
| Grand Falconer | United Kingdom | The ship was driven ashore and wrecked at Egmond aan Zee, North Holland, Netherlands. Her crew were rescued. She was on a voyage from London to Harlingen, Friesland, Netherlands. |
| Mary | (United Kingdom of Great Britain and Ireland) British North America | The schooner was lost in Trepassey Bay. She was on a voyage from St. John's, Newfoundland, to Prince Edward Island. |

== 22 June ==
List of shipwrecks: 22 June 1823
| Ship | State | Description |
|---|---|---|
| Margaret | United Kingdom | The ship ran aground near Quebec City, Lower Canada, British North America. She was on a voyage from Quebec City to Liverpool, Lancashire. Margaret was refloated on 25 June. |
| Pénélope | France | The ship ran aground in the Garonne 6 leagues (18 nautical miles (33 km) downstream of Bordeaux, Gironde) and was wrecked. She was on a voyage from Bengal, India, to Bordeaux. |

== 25 June ==
List of shipwrecks: 25 June 1823
| Ship | State | Description |
|---|---|---|
| Mary | United Kingdom | The ship was wrecked at "Cape Charles", Newfoundland, British North America. Her crew survived. She was on a voyage from Liverpool, Lancashire, to Labrador, British North America. |

== 26 June ==
List of shipwrecks: 26 June 1823
| Ship | State | Description |
|---|---|---|
| Viagante | Portugal | The ship was wrecked off Maranhão, Brazil. She was on a voyage from Maranhão to Porto. |

== 27 June ==
List of shipwrecks: 27 June 1823
| Ship | State | Description |
|---|---|---|
| Angally | United Kingdom | The pilot cutter was run down and sunk in the Bristol Channel 3 nautical miles (5.6 km) south east of The Mumbles, Glamorgan. Her three crew were rescued. |
| General Riego | Spain | The ship was driven ashore and wrecked east of Cape St. Mary's, Portugal. She was on a voyage from Havana, Cuba, to Cádiz. |

== 29 June ==
List of shipwrecks: 29 June 1823
| Ship | State | Description |
|---|---|---|
| Providence Success | United Kingdom | The ship was driven ashore and wrecked in Miramichi Bay. |

== Unknown date ==
List of shipwrecks: Unknown date 1823
| Ship | State | Description |
|---|---|---|
| Clarion | United Kingdom | The ship was wrecked in the Bay of Valparaíso. |
| Four Brothers | United Kingdom | The ship was run down and sunk in the North Sea off the coast of Essex with the loss of four of her crew. |
| General Le Cor | Portuguese Navy | The corvette sank at Montevideo, Brazil. |
| Grace | United Kingdom | The ship was abandoned in the South Atlantic. Six of her thirteen crew reached Rio de Janeiro, Brazil, on 11 June. The other seven arrived on 28 June. |
| Lyon | United States | The ship was wrecked in the Bay of Valparaíso. |
| Savage | United States | The ship sprang a leak and was abandoned by her crew. Two of them were rescued by Clarissa Ann (United States).Savage was on a voyage from Bremen to Baltimore, Maryland. |
| Swift | unknown | The schooner was run ashore at Porto dos Touros, Brazil, having been stolen from St. Jago de Cuba, Cuba. |
| Warren | United States | The ship was wrecked on Sugar Key, Bahamas, before 21 June. She was on a voyage from a French port to Havana, Cuba. |
