= James Bischoff =

Chairman of the Van Diemen's Land Company

- Born: c. 1776
- Died: 1845
- Known for: Chairman and Managing Director of the Van Diemen's Land Company

James Bischoff (1776–1845) was Chairman and Managing Director of the Van Diemen's Land Company, and author of works on the wool trade and Van Diemen's Land.

== Life ==
Bischoff was of a German family which settled in Leeds in 1718. He was born in Leeds about 1776, and was brought up there. His early mercantile pursuits were connected with the wool and woollen trades, and he took a lively interest in all measures likely to affect them. Being convinced that the restrictive laws relating to wool were bad, he used his utmost endeavours to bring about a change. He published some letters on the subject in 1816 in the Leeds Mercury and the Farmers Journal. In 1819 he was appointed one of the deputies from the manufacturing districts to promote a repeal of the Wool Act, and wrote a pamphlet entitled Reasons for the Immediate Repeal of the Tax on Foreign Wool (1819, octavo, 47 pages).

== Works ==
In the following year he published 'Observations on the Report of the Earl of Sheffield to the Meeting at Lewes Wool Fair, July 20, 1820'. In 1825 William Huskisson, then President of the Board of Trade, invited the advice of Bischoff with regard to some proposed alterations in commercial policy, particularly a reduction of the duty on foreign manufactured goods. Bischoff gave his opinion strongly in favour of freedom of trade, and the reasons he advanced had great weight with the minister in the proposal which he subsequently made in parliament. He was examined in 1828 before the Privy Council on the subject of the wool trade, and in the same year published The Wool Question considered: being an Examination of the Report of the Select Committee of the House of Lords appointed to take into consideration the State of the British Wool Trade, and an Answer to Earl Stanhope's Letter to the Owners and Occupiers of Sheep Farms (octavo, 112 pages). In 1832 he issued a Sketch of the history of Van Diemen's Land, illustrated by a map of the island, and an account of the Van Diemen's Land Company, octavo, the map is by John Arrowsmith.

In 1836 he published an essay on Marine Insurances, their Importance, their Rise, Progress, and Decline, and their Claim to Freedom from Taxation, (octavo, 34 pages).

Bischoff's most important work was: A comprehensive History of the Woollen and Worsted Manufactures, and the Natural and Commercial History of Sheep, from the Earliest Records to the Present Period (Leeds, 1842, 2 vols. octavo). His last publication was a pamphlet on Foreign Tariffs; their Injurious Effects on British Manufactures, especially the Woollen Manufacture; with proposed remedies. Being chiefly a series of Articles inserted in the; "Leeds Mercury" from October 1842 to February 1843 (1843 octavo 69 pages).

== Marriage and business ==
Bischoff, who married in 1802 Peggy, daughter of David Stansfeld of Leeds, carried on business as a merchant and insurance broker for many years in London, and died at his home, Highbury Terrace, on 8 February 1845 aged 69. He became Chairman of the Van Diemen's Land Company in 1828 and Managing Director from 1832 until 1833.

== Legacy ==
Mount Bischoff, in the north-west corner of Tasmania, is said to derive its name from James Bischoff. (Note: Gentlemen's Magazine, April 1845, page 443;) (Note: Preface to Bischoff's Hist. of the Woollen and Worsted Manufactures) (Note: Stansfeld pedigree in Foster's Yorkshire Pedigrees)
