= Van Diemen's Land Company =

Farming corporation

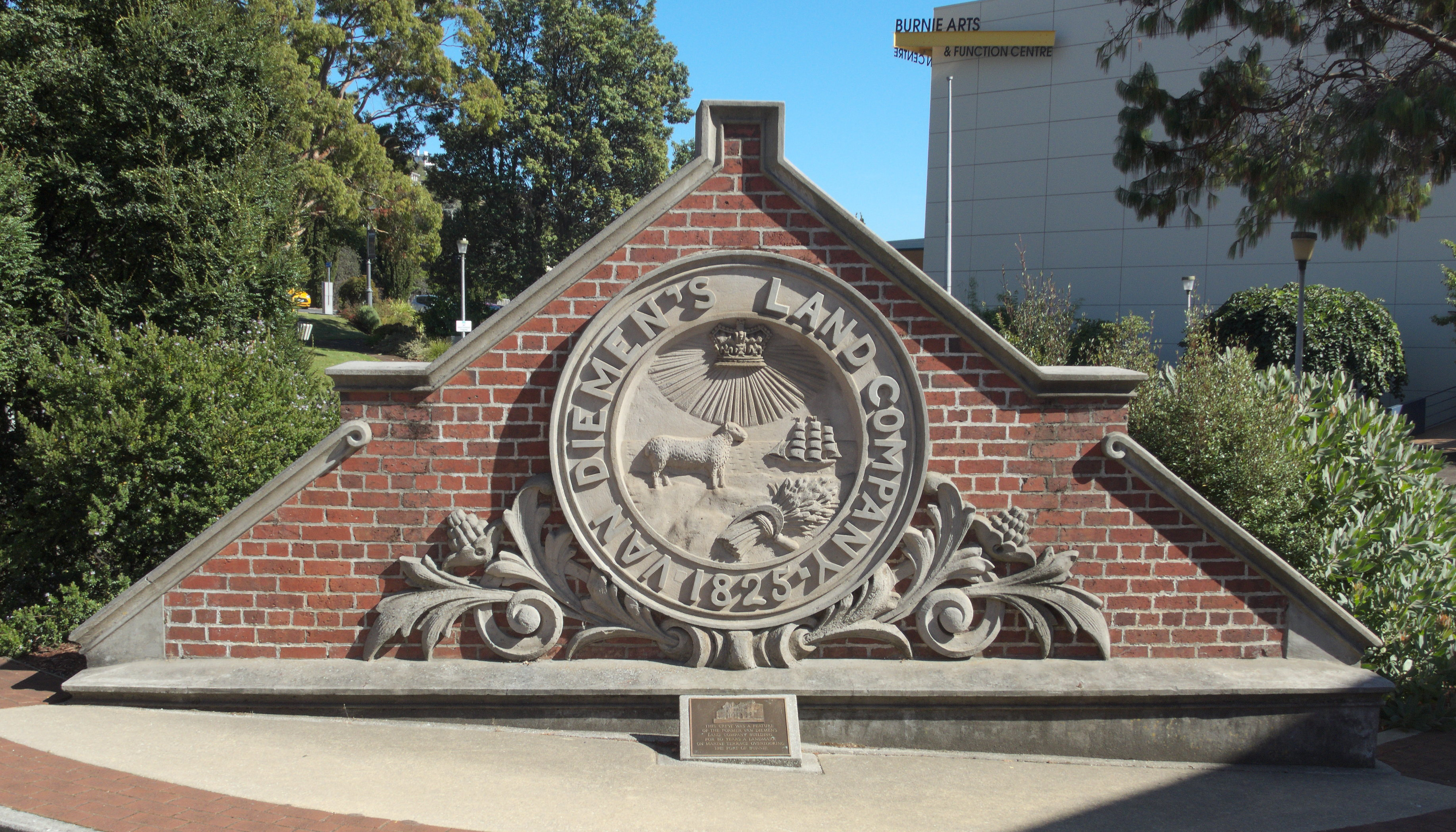
- Crest from the company building in Burnie.
- Type: Privately held company
- Industry: Agriculture
- Founded: 1825; 201 years ago
- Headquarters: Australia
- Products: Wool (historically); Milk
- Owner: Van Dairy Limited (since 2016)

(Note: The Acts of Parliament (Commencement) Act 1793.)

The Van Diemen's Land Company (also known as Van Dieman Land Company) is a farming corporation in the Australian state of Tasmania. It was founded in 1825 and received a royal charter the same year, and was granted 250,000 acres (1,000 km^{2}) in northwest Van Diemen's Land (now Tasmania) in 1826. The company's initial investors were a group of London merchants who planned a wool growing venture to supply the needs of the British textile industry.

== History ==
=== Establishment ===
Van Diemen's Land Company Act 1825
- Act of Parliament
- Parliament of the United Kingdom
- Long title: An Act for granting certain Powers and Authorities to a Company, to be incorporated by Charter, to be called "The Van Diemen's Land Company," for the Cultivation and Improvement of Waste Lands in His Majesty's Island of Van Diemen's Land, and for other Purposes relating thereto.
- Citation: 6 Geo. 4. c. 39
- Territorial extent: United Kingdom

Dates
- Royal assent: 10 June 1825
- Commencement: 10 June 1825 (Note: The Acts of Parliament (Commencement) Act 1793.)
Other legislation
Amended by	Van Diemen's Land Company Act 1979

Status: Amended

Text of statute as originally enacted

In the early 1820s, the colonial authorities of the British Empire under Lord Bathurst, favoured large private corporations and wealthy individuals to develop and commercialise the significant land assets located in the Australian colonies. This policy was implemented to ensure a cheap supply of quality wool for the growing textile factories in Britain, and also to concentrate the profits obtained from this development to remain within the established privileged social classes.

In 1824, two corporations were subsequently formed: the Australian Agricultural Company, organised by the powerful capitalist John Macarthur; and the Van Diemen's Land Company, which was under the directorship of James Bischoff with the colonists William Sorell and Edward Curr enlisted as managers.

While the Australian Agricultural Company focused on property assets in New South Wales, the directors of the Van Diemen's Land Company sought a 500,000-acre land grant in the uncolonised north-west region of Van Diemen's Land between Port Sorell and Cape Grim. In November 1825, a royal charter was issued for the company, but the associated Van Diemen's Land Company Act 1825 (6 Geo. 4. c. 39) only authorised a land grant for half the requested size. However, by 1828 this was increased to 350,000 acres spread across several immense blocks, with the company effectively monopolising the whole north-west region.

The Van Diemen's Land Company established its headquarters at Circular Head under the management of Edward Curr who arrived in Van Diemen's Land in 1826. Much of the initial cargo, stock and farm labourers arrived in Van Diemen's Land aboard Tranmere. Company surveyors, such as Henry Hellyer, explored and mapped out the most desirable areas of land, with the company eventually staking large claims at places which became known as Woolnorth, Circular Head, Robbins Island, Middlesex Plains, Hampshire Hills, Surrey Hills and Emu Bay.

The land taken up by the company was occupied by the Peerapper people of Aboriginal Tasmanians, who had maintained their hunting ground grasslands for centuries through firestick farming methods. These lands were now to be forcefully appropriated by the company for sheep farming and other agricultural pursuits. Edward Curr implemented an intensely violent policy against the Peerapper, openly stating that successful occupation of the land would only be achieved by the extermination or expulsion of the Indigenous population.

Several large massacres of the Peerapper were conducted by the employees of the Van Diemen's Land Company under Curr's reign, including the Cape Grim massacre. By 1835, the Peerapper had been completely erased from the entire region, either by being killed or being removed to the Wybalenna Aboriginal Establishment on Flinders Island.

For many years the costs of farming were only just recovered. By the 1880s the company was making more money from timber felling and timber exports than from farming.

The Van Diemen's Land Company introduced bounties on the thylacine (Tasmanian tiger) from as early as 1830, which was a partial cause of their extinction. The company's presence also led to the decimation of local populations of the Tasmanian Emu, which also became extinct.

The company was the constructor of the early stages of the Emu Bay Railway between 1875 and 1884.

=== Recent divestiture and change in ownership ===
The company managed to retain some of its original land grant during the 20th century, but by the 1970s it only owned the Woolnorth part, which amounted to just one seventh of its original selection.

In July 2014 it was announced the owner of the Van Diemen's Land Company, New Plymouth District Council (through Taranaki Investment Management Limited) in New Zealand, was attempting to sell the company.

On 6 November 2015, Australian company OnCard announced its entrance into an agreement to buy the Van Diemen's Land Company. The agreement, worth $250 million followed OnCard's acquisition of another dairy food products business, Meander Valley Dairy.

In 2016, Moon Lake Investments, controlled by Lu Xianfeng, purchased it for A$280 million. Moon Lake Investments has since changed its name to Van Dairy Limited. In 2021, 12 farms comprising 2,200 hectares were sold to Prime Value, an asset manager based in Melbourne, for A$62.5 million. Later in 2021, 6,000 hectares in the Woolnorth area were sold to TRT Pastoral Group for over A$120 million. In February 2024, Van Dairy lost a major milk contract with Fonterra, resulting in the reduction of its herd of cows by at least 700, and possibly thousands. In March 2024, another 700 hectares of land was sold to Prime Value for A$15 million.

== See also ==
- List of oldest companies in Australia

== Bibliography ==
- Pink, Kerry Winds of Change: A History of Woolnorth (2003)
- James Bischoff, Sketch of the history of Van Diemen's Land, illustrated by a map of the island, and an account of the Van Diemen's Land Company (1832)
