= Spring Grove (1806 ship) =

UK merchant ship (1806–1824)

History

Spain
- Launched: 1801
- Captured: 1806

United Kingdom
- Name: Spring Grove
- Owner: 1806:Douglas; 1815:Wilson; 1816:William Farmer; 1818:T. W. & J. Howard, Rotherhithe
- Acquired: 1806 by purchase of a prize
- Fate: Wrecked 23 November 1824

General characteristics
- Tons burthen: 256, or 264
- Armament: 1806:6 × 12-pounder guns "of the New Construction"; 1812:10 × 12-pounder carronades + 2 × 6-pounder chase guns

Spring Grove was a Spanish vessel, launched in 1801, that had been taken in prize in 1806 and that her new owners had renamed. She made six voyages as a Southern Whale Fishery whaler before she wrecked in 1824 on the outbound leg of what was to have been her seventh voyage.

== Career ==
Spring Grove first appeared in Lloyd's Register (LR) in the 1806 volume. Her master was [Jonathan] Greenwood, her owner W. Wilson, and her trade London–Buenos Ayres.

The voyage took place during the British invasions of the River Plate (1806–1807), and was a commercial venture. In addition to any cargo, Spring Grove was carrying Reverend [David Hill] Creighton, who was travelling under the auspices of the London Missionary Society. She left Montevideo for London on 10 February 1807.

=== First whaling voyage (1808–1811) ===
Captain William Mattinson (or Maddison), sailed from London on 2 August 1808, bound for Port Jackson and then the Southern Whale Fishery. She sailed via Rio de Janeiro. She arrived at Port Jackson on 6 February 1809 with merchandise, and left for the fishery on 17 March. She returned to Port Jackson on 4 October with sperm oil. She left again on 19 November. She was reported to have been in the Bay of Islands in the early part of April 1810.

In March 1810, half-a-dozen whalers gathered in Bay of Islands and launched a retributionary attack on the Maori after the Boyd massacre. The whalers killed an estimated 16 to 60 Maori and burnt some structures. One sailor was accidentally killed. The vessels involved in the attack were Atalanta, Inspector, New Zealander, Perseverance, Speke, and Spring Grove.

Spring grove again returned to Port Jackson on 19 July with sperm oil. She sailed for England on 20 October. On 18 August 1811 she was at Rio de Janeiro, having come from "New Holland". Mattinson arrived back in London on 19 November 1811.

=== Second whaling voyage (1812–1815) ===
Lloyd's Register for 1812 showed Spring Grove with Mattinson, master, changing to Douglas, W. Wilson, owner, and trade London–the Brazils. On 4 July 1812 Captain Douglas sailed from Gravesend for Madeira and on. On 14 July she sailed from Portsmouth for Rio de Janeiro. She arrived there on 6 September.

Spring Grove arrived at Port Jackson on 3 January 1813 with merchandise, having first touched at Hobart Town where she picked up 10 passengers for Sydney. She left for the fishery on 23 February and returned to Port Jackson on 13 August with sperm oil. She left for the fishery again on 16 September, likely calling at Norfolk Island in late September as noted in the Sydney Gazette of 4 September 1813. She then continued on with her whaling voyage into the South Seas.

She was next reported to have left St Helena on 22 December 1814 in company with Guildford. She had come from the south seas and she parted from Guildford at 10°N 25°W.

=== Third whaling voyage (1815–1816) ===
Captain Douglas sailed from England in April 1815. Spring Grove returned from the south seas on 14 May 1816 with 350 casks.

=== Fourth whaling voyage (1816–1818) ===
Captain George Rule sailed from England on 22 September 1816, bound for Peru. Spring Grove returned on 23 June 1818.

=== Fifth whaling voyage (1818–1821) ===
Captain Rule sailed for the Galapagos Islands on 1 November 1818. Spring Grove returned on 15 June 1821 with 600 casks (1607 barrels) or 1717 in the log or 64 whales.

=== Sixth whaling voyage (1821–1824) ===
Captain John Rice (or Price), sailed from England on 30 September 1821, bound for Peru. In June 1822 Spring Grove was off Peru while in the company of L'Aigle. Spring Grove returned to England on 16 March 1824 with 580 casks.

== Fate ==
Spring Grove appeared in the 1825 issue of the Register of Shipping (RS) with Hughes, master, Jones, owner, and trade London–South Seas. She had undergone small repairs in 1824. Captain Hughes sailed from England on 16 October 1824.

While Spring Grove was on her way to the South Seas she was wrecked north of Saffee, on the coast of Morocco. A letter from Mogadore, dated 23 December 1823, reported that Spring Grove, Hughes, master, of and from London, had wrecked on 23 November. Only a small part of her tackle, etc. had been saved, and two crewmen had drowned. Margaret, from Mogadore, brought home part of her crew.
