= Starbuck Island =

Uninhabited coral island of eastern Kiribati

Starbuck Island (Volunteer Island)

- Location within Kiribati Location within Oceania Location within Pacific Ocean

Geography
- Location: Pacific Ocean
- Coordinates: 5°38′30″S 155°52′40″W
- Kiribati

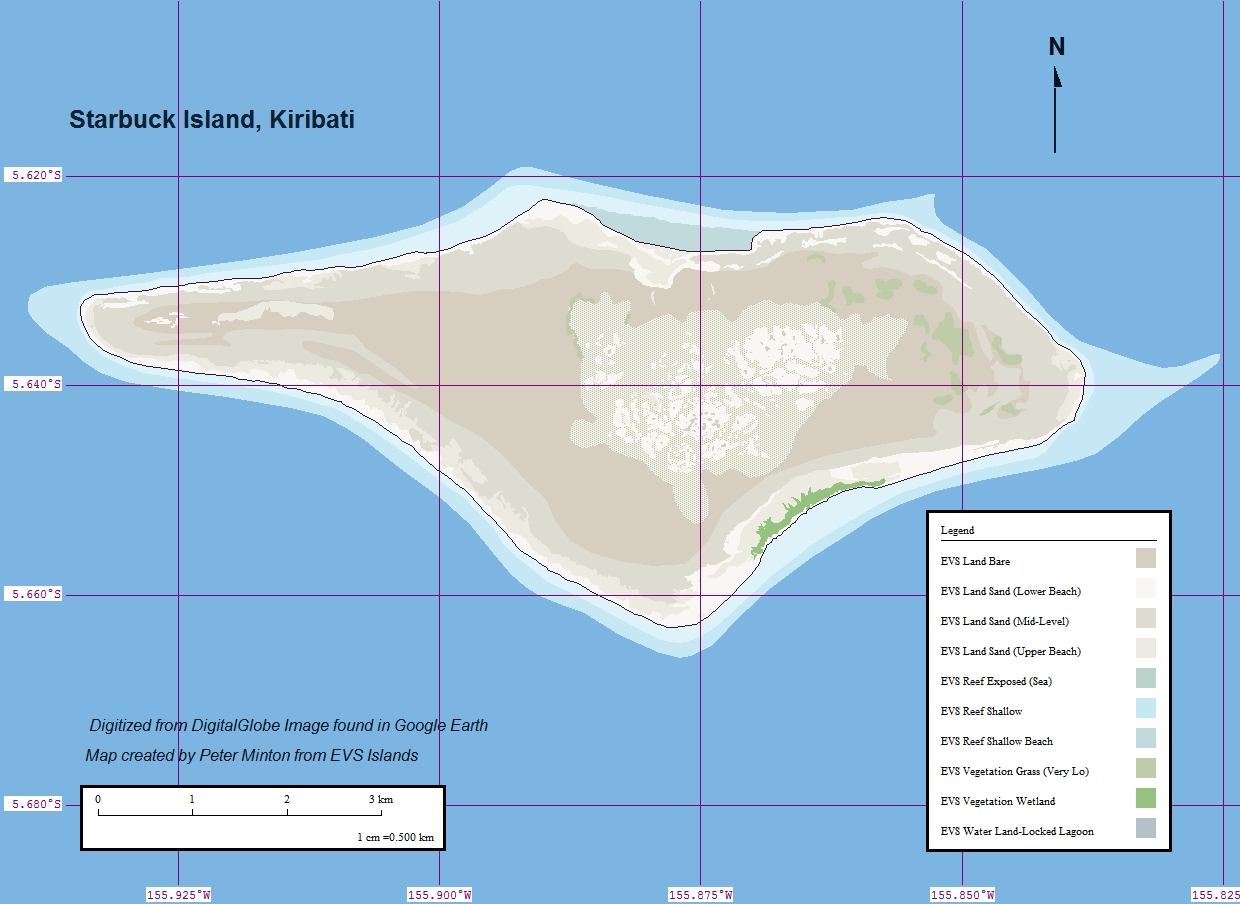
Map of Starbuck Island

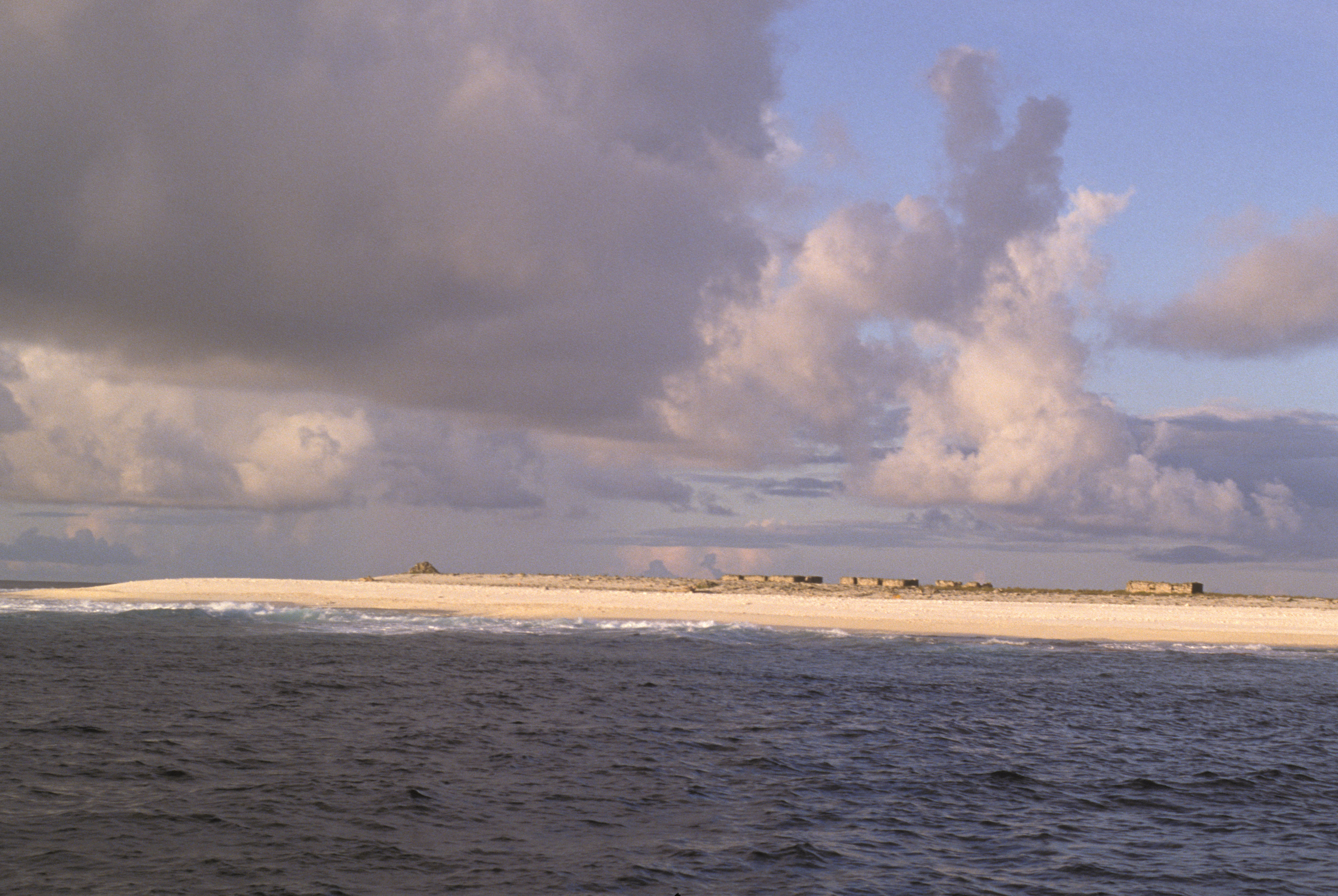
Ruins of the 19th-century guano settlement on Starbuck Island

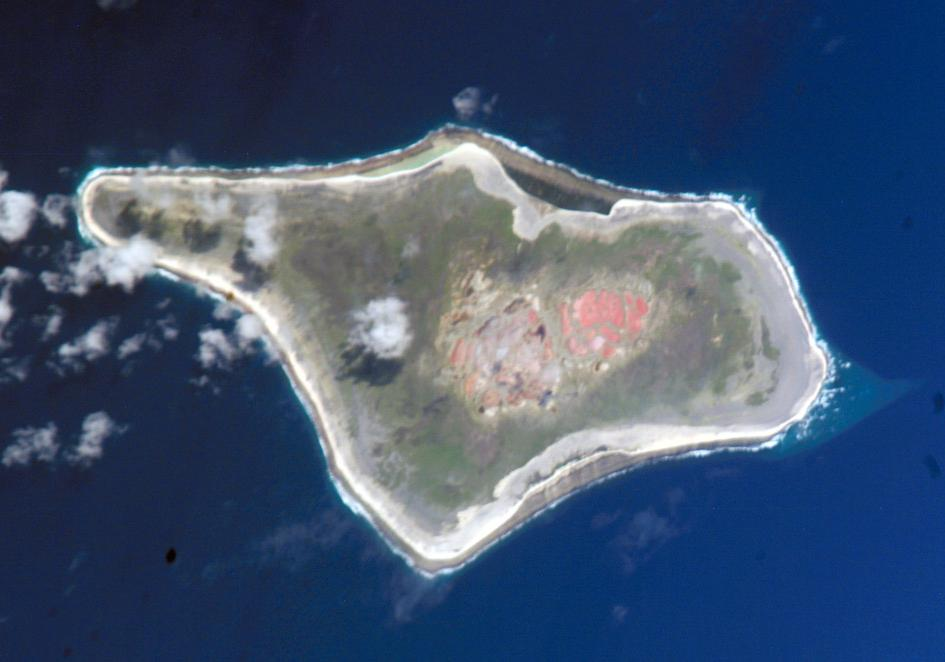
Starbuck as seen from space

Starbuck Island (or Volunteer Island) is an uninhabited coral island in the central Pacific, and is part of the Central Line Islands of Kiribati. Its former names include "Barren Island", "Coral Queen Island", "Hero Island", "Low Island", and "Starve Island". It is completely unrelated to the coffee chain Starbucks.

== Geography, flora and fauna ==
Located just east from the geographic center of the Pacific Ocean (4°58′S 158°45′W), and measuring 8.9 kilometres (5.5 miles) east-to-west and 3.5 kilometres (2.2 miles) north-to-south, Starbuck Island has a land area of 1,620 hectares (4,003 acres). It is a low, dry, coral limestone island with a steep beach backed by a 6–8-metre-high (20–26 ft) bank composed of large coral fragments. Several hypersaline lagoons form on the island's eastern side. These occasionally dry up, and are said to be dangerous to approach: one worker during the island's guano-mining days sank up to his neck in salty mud before being rescued.

There is no freshwater on the island, which is one of the drier atolls in the Line Island group. Annual yearly rainfall averages approximately 800 mm (31.5 in).

Little vegetation exists on Starbuck; stunted Sida fallax scrub and low herbs and grasses predominate, along with a few Cordia subcordata bushes and bunch grass. Photos have shown a few palm trees growing near the center of the island.

The island boasts a large colony of sooty terns, estimated at 1.5 million pairs, together with Polynesian rats, feral cats, green turtles, and around fifteen other species of seabirds. Other accounts estimate the sooty tern population to be as high as three to six million birds.

== History ==
James Henderson, merchant captain of the East India Company ship Hercules, sighted the island in 1819 while sailing from South America to Calcutta, India. Soon after his arrival a local newspaper, The Calcutta Journal (or Political, Commercial, and Literary Gazette), published Henderson's report of three islands which he had encountered during his voyage, but did not state the exact date for his sighting of modern Starbuck Island. Henry Evans Maude estimated that this may have been in early February 1819. The next captain known to have seen it was Obed Starbuck, captain of the whaler Hero out of Nantucket, on September 5, 1823.

The island was sighted again on December 12, 1823 by Obed's first cousin, Valentine Starbuck, the American-born master of the British whaling ship L'Aigle. L'Aigle was carrying King Kamehameha II of Hawaii and Queen Kamāmalu and their retinue to England. Valentine Starbuck is the first non-Pacific Islander known to have set foot on the island.

The island was finally charted in 1825 by Captain The 7th Lord Byron (a cousin of the famous poet). Byron, commanding the British warship HMS Blonde, was returning to London from a special mission to Honolulu to repatriate the remains of the Hawaiian royal couple, King Kamehameha II and Queen Kamāmalu, who had died of measles while trying to visit King George IV. Lord Byron also sighted and charted Mauke and Malden Island, which he named after his surveying officer.

Starbuck Island was claimed by the United States under the 1856 Guano Islands Act, but was controlled by Britain after 1866, when possession was taken by Commodore Swinburn of HMS Mutine. The island was mined for phosphate between 1870 and 1893. It formed part of the British Gilbert and Ellice Islands colony prior to the independence of Kiribati in 1979. American claims to the atoll were formally vacated in the Treaty of Tarawa, signed the same year.

At its highest point, the island rises to only about 5 meters. Due to its low profile and dangerous surrounding reefs, a number of ships were wrecked at Starbuck Island in the late 19th century. The French transport Euryale wrecked there in March 1870 and the crew was marooned on the atoll for 35 days. The experience allowed the captain of Euryale, future contre-admiral Albert des Portes, to finally chart the correct geographical location of the island. All members of the crew were eventually rescued and returned to France.

On August 7, 1896 the Norwegian ship Seladon was wrecked against the barrier. The crew went into the lifeboats and drifted for 30 days until they landed on the island of Niulakita, Tuvalu. They lived together with a few natives for 10 months until they were rescued by a passing ship.

Starbuck Island has been designated as the Starbuck Island Wildlife Sanctuary. In 2014 the Kiribati government established a 12-nautical-mile fishing exclusion zone around each of the southern Line Islands: Caroline (commonly called Millennium), Flint, Vostok, Malden, and Starbuck.

== Photo gallery ==
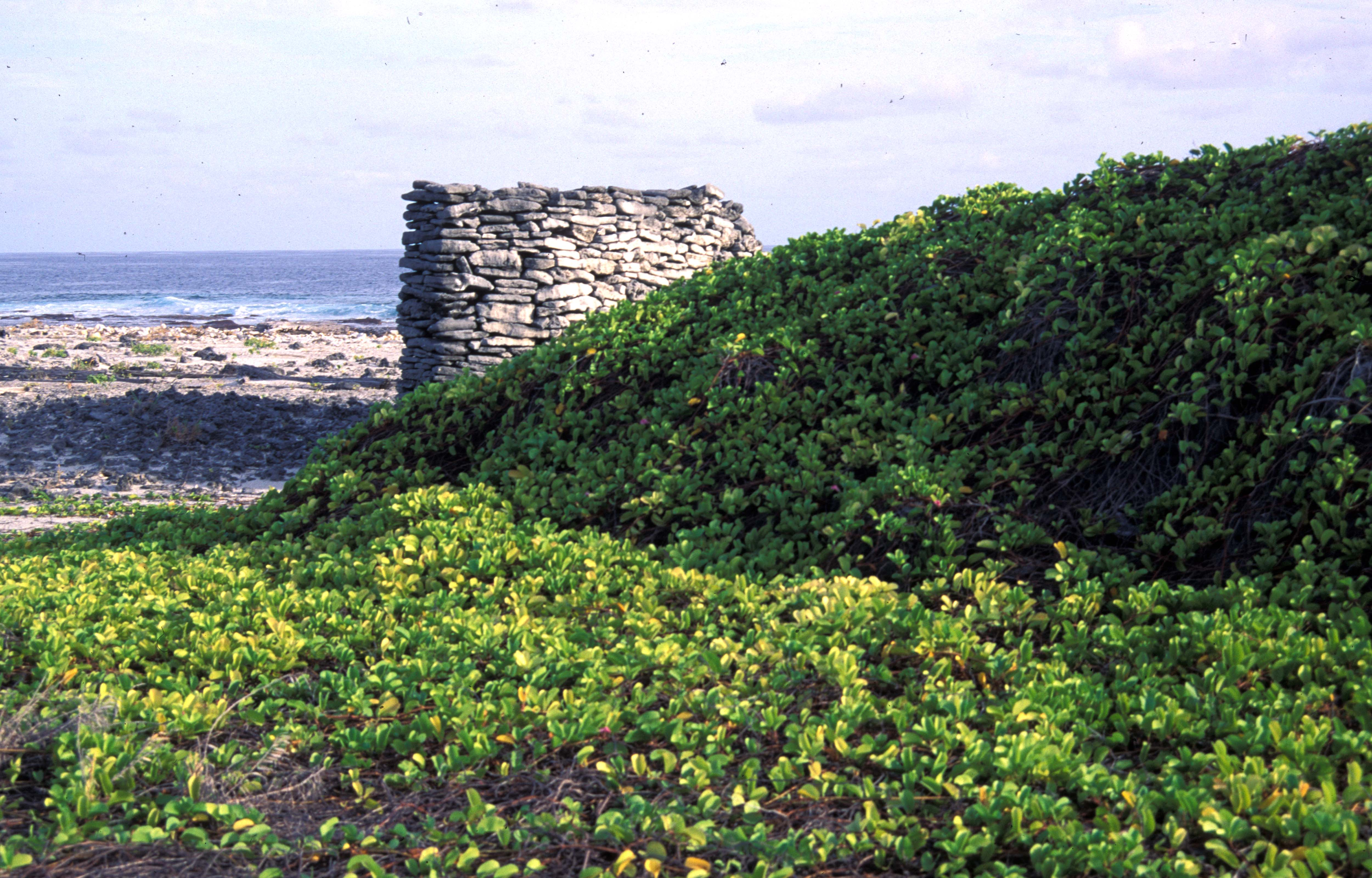
Ruined wall from 19th-century guano settlement on Starbuck Island

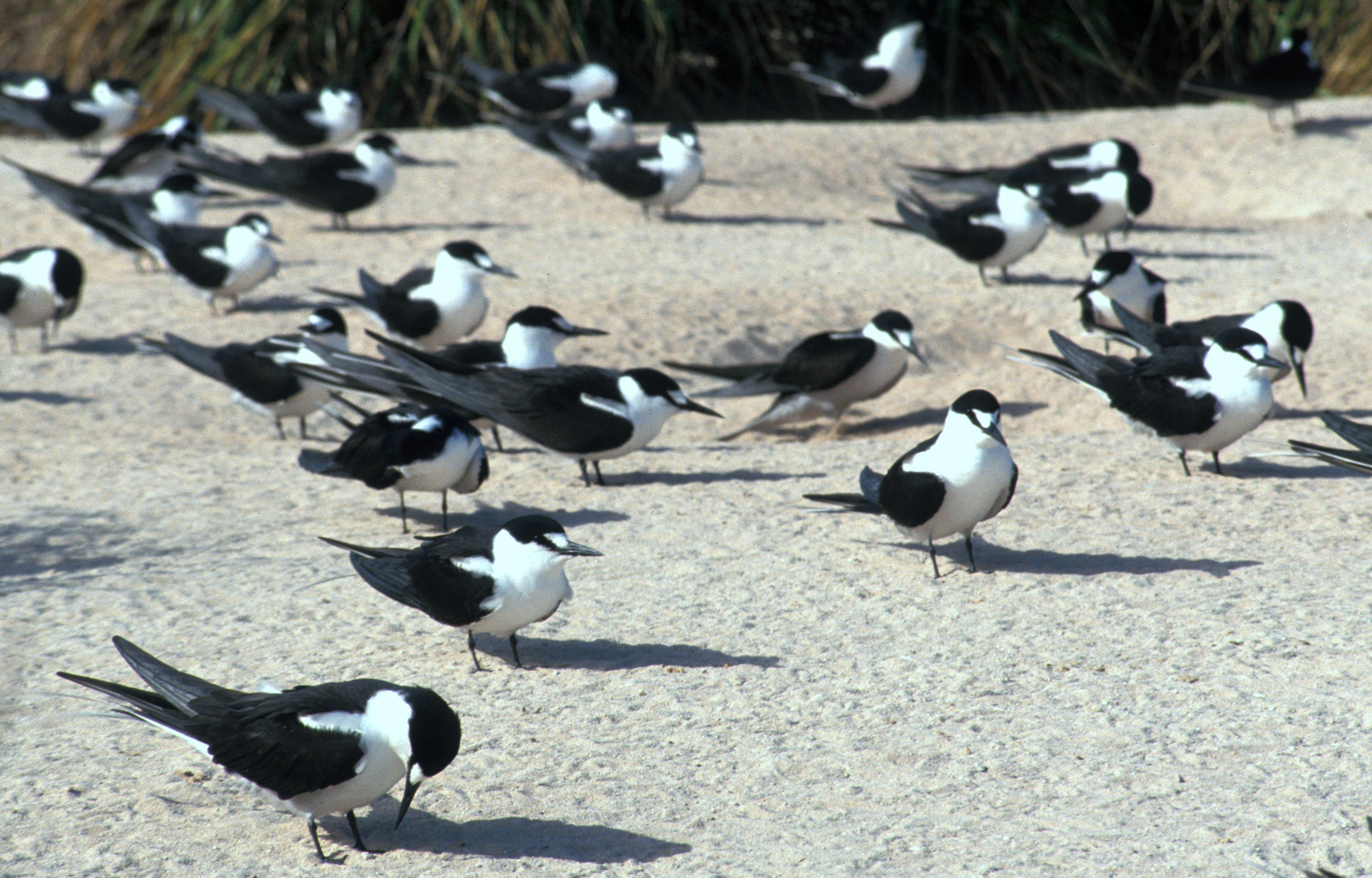
Sooty tern colony on Starbuck Island

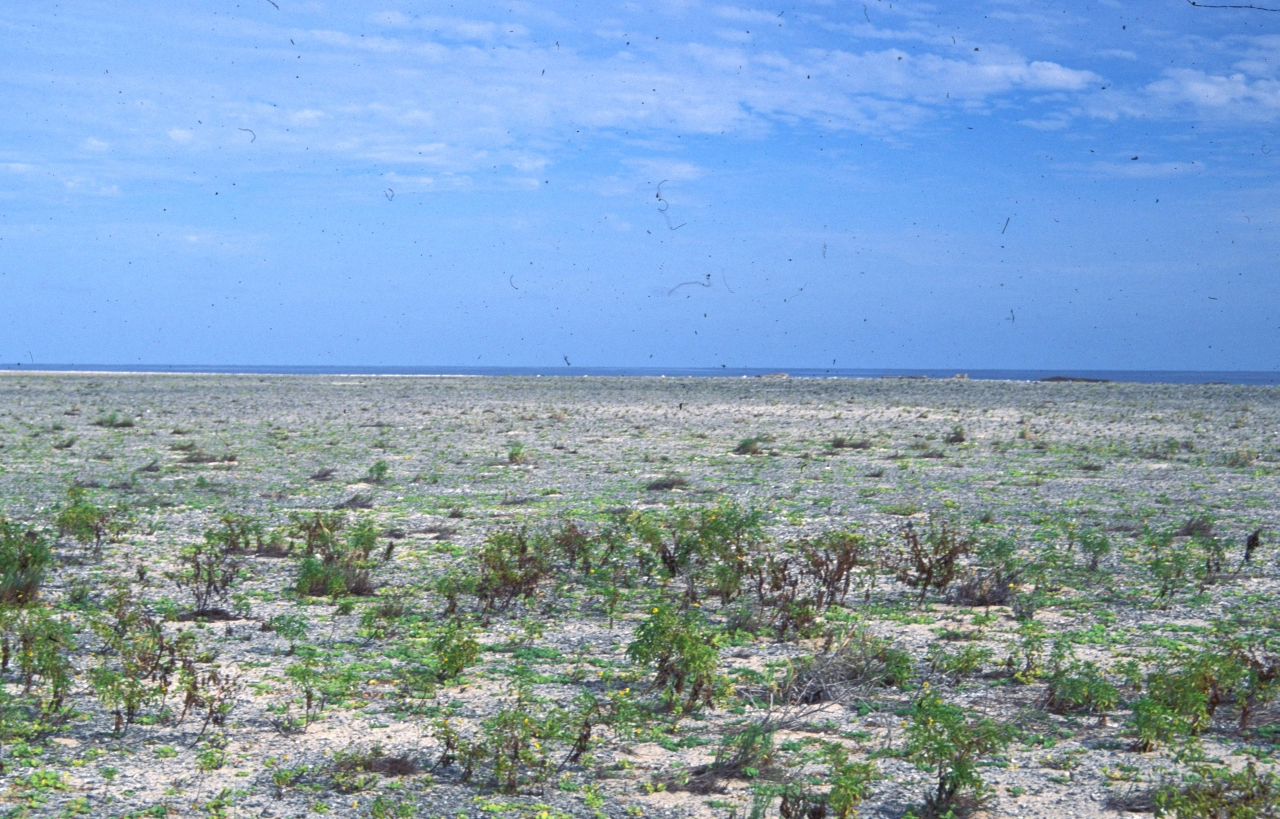
Largely barren interior of Starbuck Island

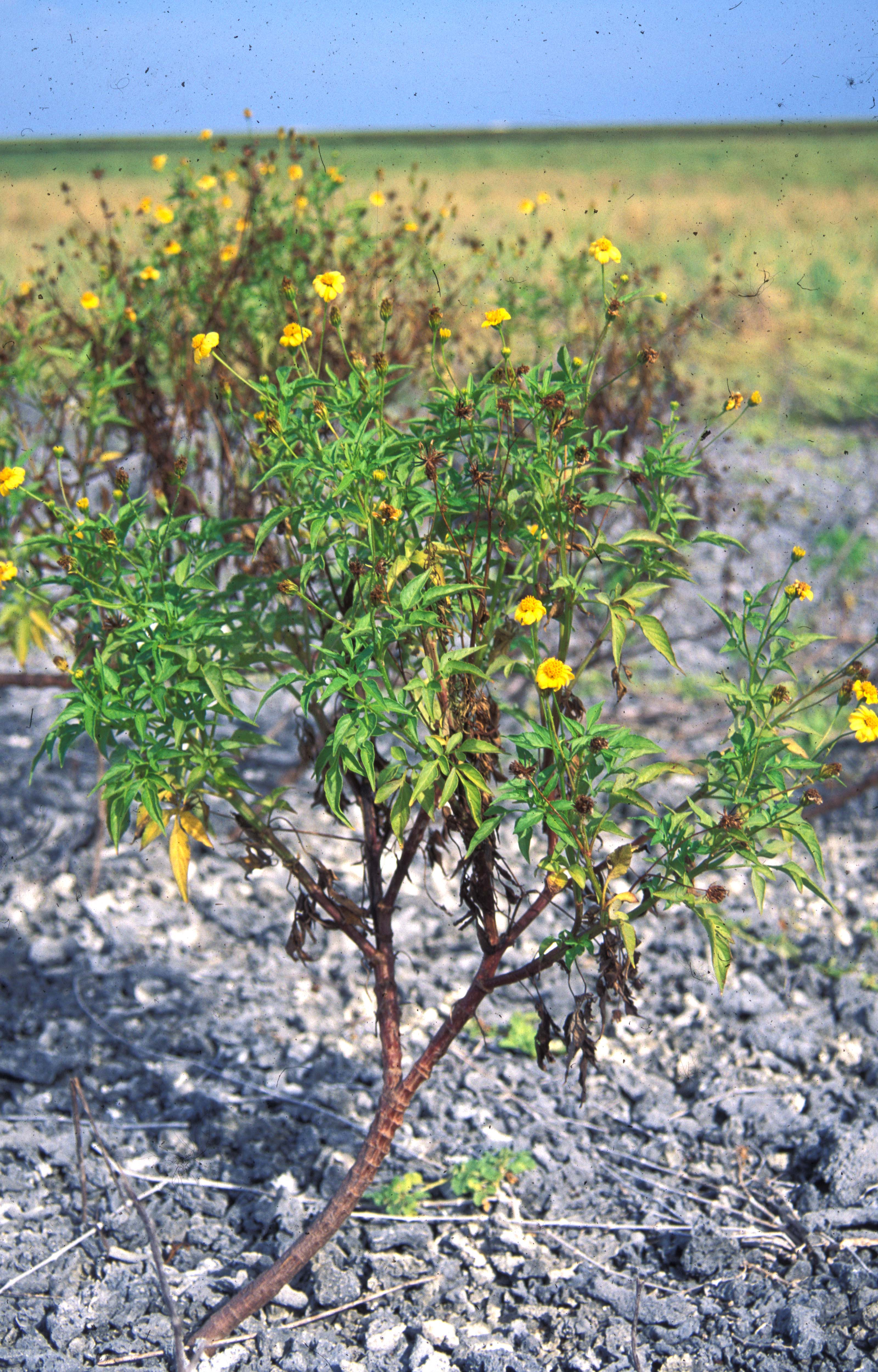
Bidens kiribatiensis on Starbuck Island

== See also ==
- Protected areas of Kiribati
- List of Guano Island claims
- List of islands
- Desert island

== Sources ==
- Bloxam, Andrew (1925), Diary of Andrew Bloxam: naturalist of the "Blonde" on her trip from England to the Hawaiian islands, 1824-25 Volume 10 of Bernice P. Bishop Museum special publication
- Bryan, Jr., Edwin H. (1942); American Polynesia and the Hawaiian Chain, Honolulu, Hawaii: Tongg Publishing Company
- Dunmore, John (1992); Who's Who in Pacific Navigation, Australia:Melbourne University Press, ISBN 0-522-84488-X
- Quanchi, Max & Robson, John, (2005); Historical Dictionary of the Discovery and Exploration of the Pacific Islands, USA: Scarecrow Press, ISBN 0-8108-5395-7
