= Starbuck (whaling family) =

Group of whalers based in Nantucket, Massachusetts

The Starbuck family were prominent in the history of whaling in the Hawaiian Islands, based in Nantucket, Massachusetts, from the seventeenth to the nineteenth centuries. Some members of the family gained wider exposure due to their discovery of various islands in the Pacific Ocean.

== Valentine Starbuck ==
Valentine Starbuck was born on May 22, 1791, in Nantucket. He died in England, but when is not known.

A descendant of one of the first English settlers of Nantucket, Valentine commanded various whaling ships (whalers) in the Pacific. In 1823 he was captain of the British whaleship L'Aigle, which Hawaiian King Kamehameha II chartered for a trip to Britain on a state visit. The passengers included Queen Kamāmalu and a few other nobles. The Hawaiian king and queen died of measles while at London, and Valentine was sued by his employers for not completing his whaling voyage.

Prior to his journey to London, Valentine had sighted an island in the Pacific, known as Starbuck or Volunteer Island. When Royal Navy captain George Anson Byron came across this island when returning the bodies of the Hawaiian king and queen to their homeland on HMS Blonde, he named the island "Starbuck" in Valentine's honour. However, his cousin Obed Starbuck had sighted the island previously.

== Obed Starbuck ==
Obed Starbuck was born on May 11, 1797, also in Nantucket, and died June 27, 1882.

Whaling in the Pacific for many years, Obed made a number of significant voyages. Sailing on the Hero 1822-1824, which returned to Nantucket with 2,173 barrels of sperm oil, he discovered an island on 5 September 1823, located at 5°32' S, 155°5' W, since known as Starbuck Island (also called "Hero Island").

From 1824 to 1826, Obed captained the Loper, in which vessel he was the first European to visit an outlying island in the Phoenix group, which he named "New Nantucket" and which, when re-discovered in 1835 by Michael Baker, was renamed Baker Island. Obed named "Loper Island" (Niutao) which was sighted by Francisco Antonio Mourelle on May 5, 1781, and who named Niutao El Gran Cocal ('The Great Coconut Plantation'). Obed also named "Tracy Island" (Vaitupu), and various other now-unidentified islands. Based on reported locations, these might include Birnie Island and Sydney Island, previously discovered by Capt. Emmett in 1820, although it is hard to be precise due to the bearings given. On this journey, Obed also completed the mapping of Tuvalu, which had been begun by Captain George Barrett of the Nantucket whaler Independence II.

Other sources suggest that Obed discovered New Nantucket in 1823, while aboard the Hero. J.N. Reynolds, while reporting to the US House of Representatives in 1828, reported a sighting of an island "5 deg. 1 min. south latitude. Seen by O. Starbuck, northwest from Marquesas".

Obed made later whaling voyages on the Loper (1829–1830), Rose in 1831 (which ran aground), and the Zone in 1843–1846.

== Alexander Starbuck ==
Alexander Starbuck (1841–1925) was in the watch-making business as a young man, later working in newspaper publishing and as a historian. He was the author of History of the American Whale Fishery (1878).

== In fiction ==
The character Starbuck appears in Herman Melville's 1851 novel Moby-Dick as the chief mate of the whaling ship the Pequod.
