= List of ships named Euryale =

A number of ships have been named Euryale, after the Gorgon of that name, including:

== French ships ==
- French brig Euryale (1813), a brig in service 1814−46
- French brig Euryale (1863), a Génie-class brig

== US ships ==
- USS Euryale (AS-22), a Euryale-class submarine tender
