= Niulakita =

Reef island and one of the nine districts of Tuvalu

- Reef Island
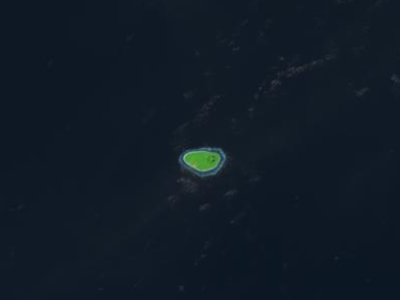
- Satellite picture

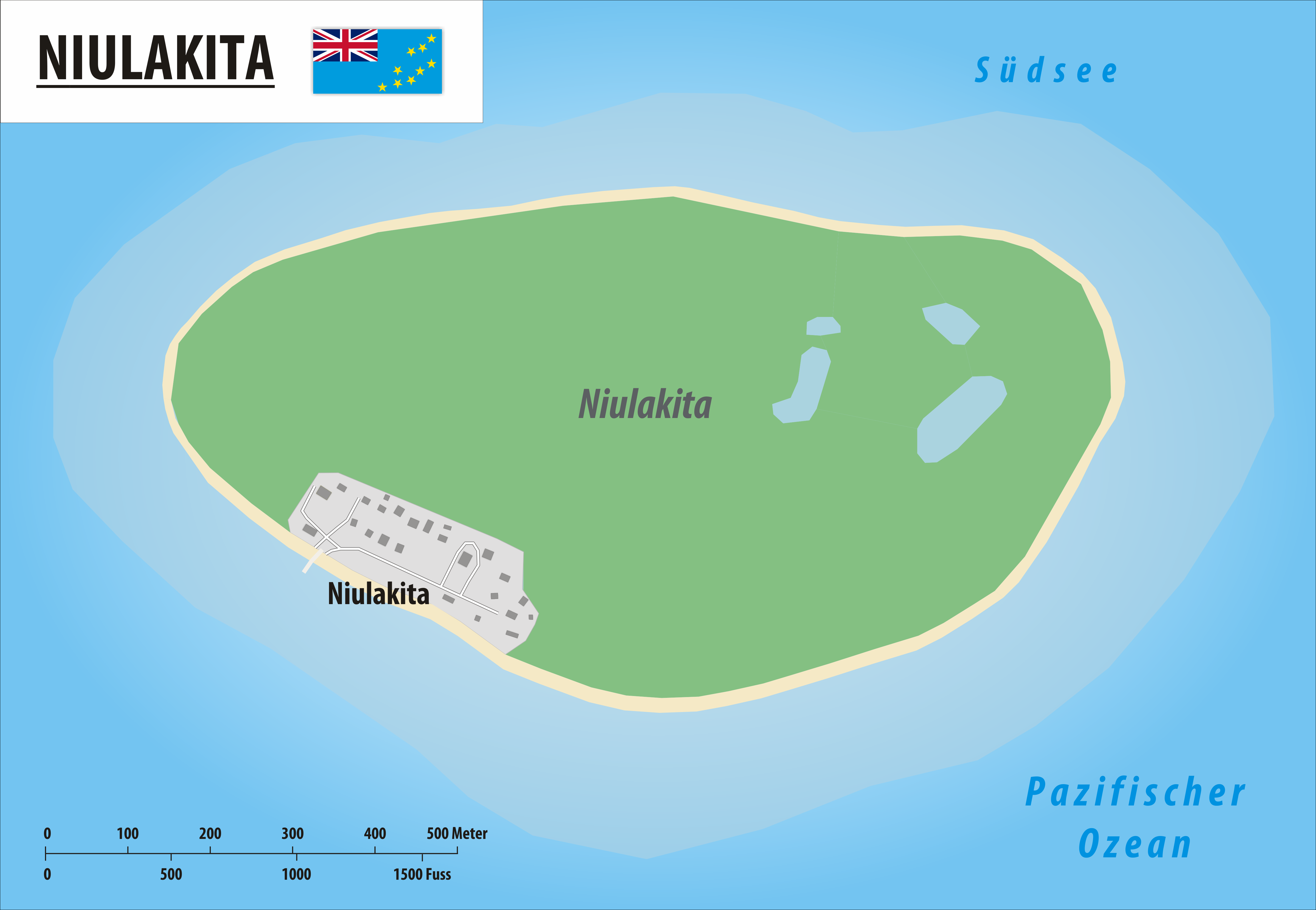
- Map of the island

- Location in Tuvalu
- Coordinates: 10°47′21″S 179°28′23″E
- Country: Tuvalu

Area
  - Total: 0.420 km^{2} (0.162 sq mi)
- Elevation: 4.6 m (15 ft)

Population (2022)
  - Total: 36
  - Density: 86/km^{2} (220/sq mi)

Niulakita is the southernmost island of Tuvalu, and also the name of the only village on this island. Niulakita has a population of 36 (2022 Census). The residents of Niulakita have moved to the island from Niutao. Niulakita is represented in the Parliament of Tuvalu by the members of the constituency of Niutao.

== History ==
The discovery of Niulakita is claimed by travellers from Nui, led by Kaunatu who was taking people home to Vaitupu, however their canoe drifted off course to the south and they arrived at Niulakita. There was only saltbush (Atriplex) and pukavai trees (Pisonia grandis) on the islands. Kaeula, one of the passengers, died and was buried with the last of their coconuts planted at the head of his grave. The island was named by Kaunatu after a place of that name on Nui.

The first sighting recorded by Europeans of Niulakita was on 29 August 1595 by the Spanish navigator Alvaro de Mendaña during his second expedition encountered Niulakita. The island was charted as "La Solitaria" (Lonesome in Spanish). An attempt was made to find a port with two small vessels in its southern part but the bottom was uneven and rocky and they abandoned their attempts.

In 1821, Captain George Barrett, of the Nantucket whaler Independence II, visited Niulakita, which he named "Rocky (Group)". This name was never much used, but "Independence Island", after Barrett's ship, was one of the several names which came into general use for Niulakita during the 19th century. Niulakita was also known as "Sophia".

In about 1879, the elders of Vaitupu were interested in Niulakita and send a working party to plant coconuts on the island. However, in 1880 they were informed that J. C. Godeffroy und Sohn of Hamburg (operating out of Samoa) claimed ownership of the island. Notwithstanding this claim in 1884 the Vaitupu elders transferred their claim to Niulakita to H. M. Ruge and Company, a German trading firm that operated from Apia, for $400 in part payment of a debt of $13,000 owed to the company. Ruge & Co became insolvent in about 1888. On 15 April 1889 Niulakita was sold for $1,000 to Harry Jay Moors, an American citizen living in Apia, Samoa. On 16 September 1896, Captain Herbert Gibson of HMS Curacoa, recorded in his journal that six men and six women, natives of various islands, were living on Niulakita working for Moors. Captain Gibson determined that the island was not under American protection so he hoisted the Union Jack and delivered the flag, with a copy of the Declaration of British Protectorate, to the headman of the working party.

In August 1896, the sailing ship Seladon of Stavanger was wrecked on the coral reef of Starbuck Island. The crew of 16 men were in the lifeboats with little food and water for 30 days, until they arrived at Niulakita. The crew were stranded for ten months until rescued by a passing steam ship.

In 1914, Niulakita was purchased from Moors by the Samoa Shipping Trading Co Ltd, which was owned by Captain Ernest Frederick Hughes Allen. It was bought by the Gilbert and Ellice Islands Colony administration in 1944. The administration gave people from Vaitupu permission to settle Niulakita. However, in 1949, a later administration decided to have Niulakita settled by the community from Niutao, which was considered to be overpopulated. The removal of the Vaitupuans was controversial.

The United States asserted a claim to Niulakita under the Guano Islands Act of 1856; this claim was renounced under the 1983 treaty of friendship between Tuvalu and the United States.

== Geography ==
Niulakita is a reef island. There are four ponds or lakes and the village has a maneapa (a community hall) in Tuvalu, which provides meeting and recreational functions as well. The isle has an oval outline, with the longer axis running east–west (about 1 km long). This island features highest point of Tuvalu (4.6 metres (15 ft) above sea level). A fringing reef surrounds the whole island, which makes local fishing and transport into and out of the island difficult.

=== Climate ===
Climate data for Niukalita (1991–2020)
| Month | Jan | Feb | Mar | Apr | May | Jun | Jul | Aug | Sep | Oct | Nov | Dec | Year |
|---|---|---|---|---|---|---|---|---|---|---|---|---|---|
| Record high °C (°F) | 35.0 (95.0) | 34.3 (93.7) | 34.7 (94.5) | 34.4 (93.9) | 34.5 (94.1) | 35.5 (95.9) | 33.8 (92.8) | 33.8 (92.8) | 34.0 (93.2) | 34.2 (93.6) | 34.7 (94.5) | 34.4 (93.9) | 35.5 (95.9) |
| Mean daily maximum °C (°F) | 31.2 (88.2) | 31.1 (88.0) | 31.3 (88.3) | 31.6 (88.9) | 31.3 (88.3) | 30.9 (87.6) | 30.6 (87.1) | 30.7 (87.3) | 31.1 (88.0) | 31.2 (88.2) | 31.4 (88.5) | 31.5 (88.7) | 31.2 (88.1) |
| Daily mean °C (°F) | 28.3 (82.9) | 28.2 (82.8) | 28.4 (83.1) | 28.6 (83.5) | 28.4 (83.1) | 28.1 (82.6) | 27.9 (82.2) | 27.9 (82.2) | 28.2 (82.8) | 28.2 (82.8) | 28.3 (82.9) | 28.5 (83.3) | 28.3 (82.9) |
| Mean daily minimum °C (°F) | 25.5 (77.9) | 25.3 (77.5) | 25.4 (77.7) | 25.5 (77.9) | 25.5 (77.9) | 25.4 (77.7) | 25.1 (77.2) | 25.1 (77.2) | 25.2 (77.4) | 25.2 (77.4) | 25.2 (77.4) | 25.6 (78.1) | 25.3 (77.6) |
| Record low °C (°F) | 22.1 (71.8) | 5.7 (42.3) | 20.1 (68.2) | 22.0 (71.6) | 22.1 (71.8) | 21.7 (71.1) | 20.0 (68.0) | 20.2 (68.4) | 22.3 (72.1) | 7.0 (44.6) | 22.1 (71.8) | 22.0 (71.6) | 5.7 (42.3) |
| Average precipitation mm (inches) | 368.9 (14.52) | 327.8 (12.91) | 342.1 (13.47) | 195.2 (7.69) | 231.3 (9.11) | 242.3 (9.54) | 225.9 (8.89) | 220.2 (8.67) | 180.1 (7.09) | 264.9 (10.43) | 263.1 (10.36) | 271.4 (10.69) | 3,133.2 (123.37) |
| Average precipitation days (≥ 1 mm) | 18.5 | 17.0 | 17.4 | 14.8 | 16.0 | 15.6 | 15.1 | 14.7 | 13.5 | 16.0 | 15.7 | 16.5 | 190.8 |
Source: National Oceanic and Atmospheric Administration

== Education ==
Niulakita's junior school is Lotoalofa Primary School.

== See also ==
- Geography of Tuvalu
- Samoa hotspot
- List of Guano Island claims
