= Holmen (Drammen) =

Island in Drammen, Norway

Coordinates: 59°44′13″N 10°13′44″E

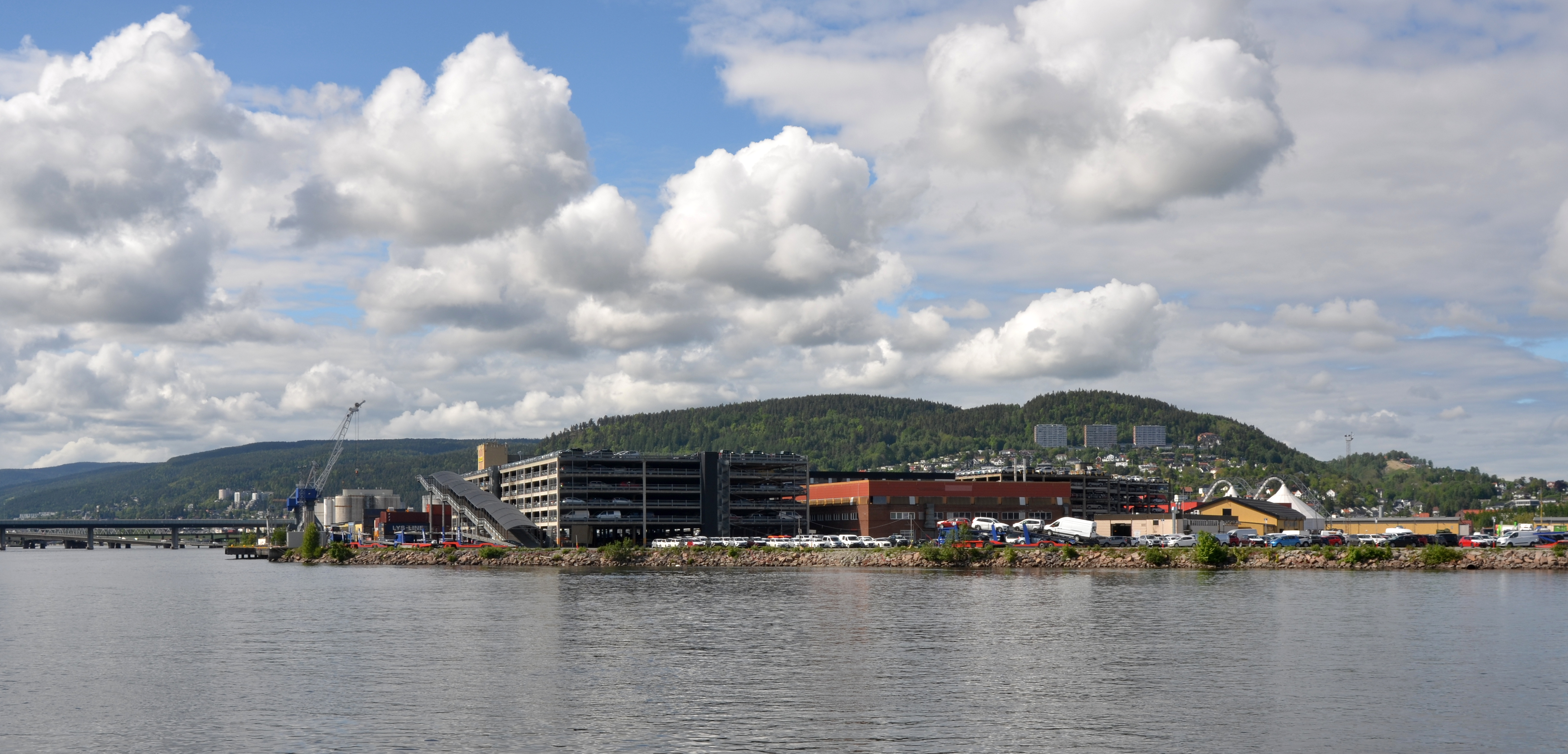
Holmen

Holmen, formerly also Møllerholmen, is an 0.6 km^{2} island at the mouth of the river Drammenselva in Drammen, Buskerud, Norway, and the only remaining island in downtown Drammen.

== History ==
Historical records from 400 years ago reveal that the island was just a sand bank, but over the years since, it has grown substantially, first due to the post-glacial rebound, but foremost due to artificial mass deposits. Some of the mass comes from infrastructure projects (tunnel excavations) near Drammen. Future deposits will increase the island's area to 0.9 km^{2}. The western tip of the island, called Holmenokken, is a public park where midsummer bonfires have been lit in later years.

The tallest building on the island, the 45 m grain elevator, was built in 1971. During construction, a secret room was added at the top, for the police (PST). The vantage point was used throughout the Cold War for surveillance of the Soviet-owned car import companies Konela and Koneisto, who had mostly Russian employees. PST believed that at least some of these employeees were KGB agents.

== Usage ==
Drammen havn is located mainly on the island. It is the largest port for car imports in Norway. Over 70% of all cars imported to Norway come through here as of 2021, and in the second half of 2020, this amounted to 70,000 cars.

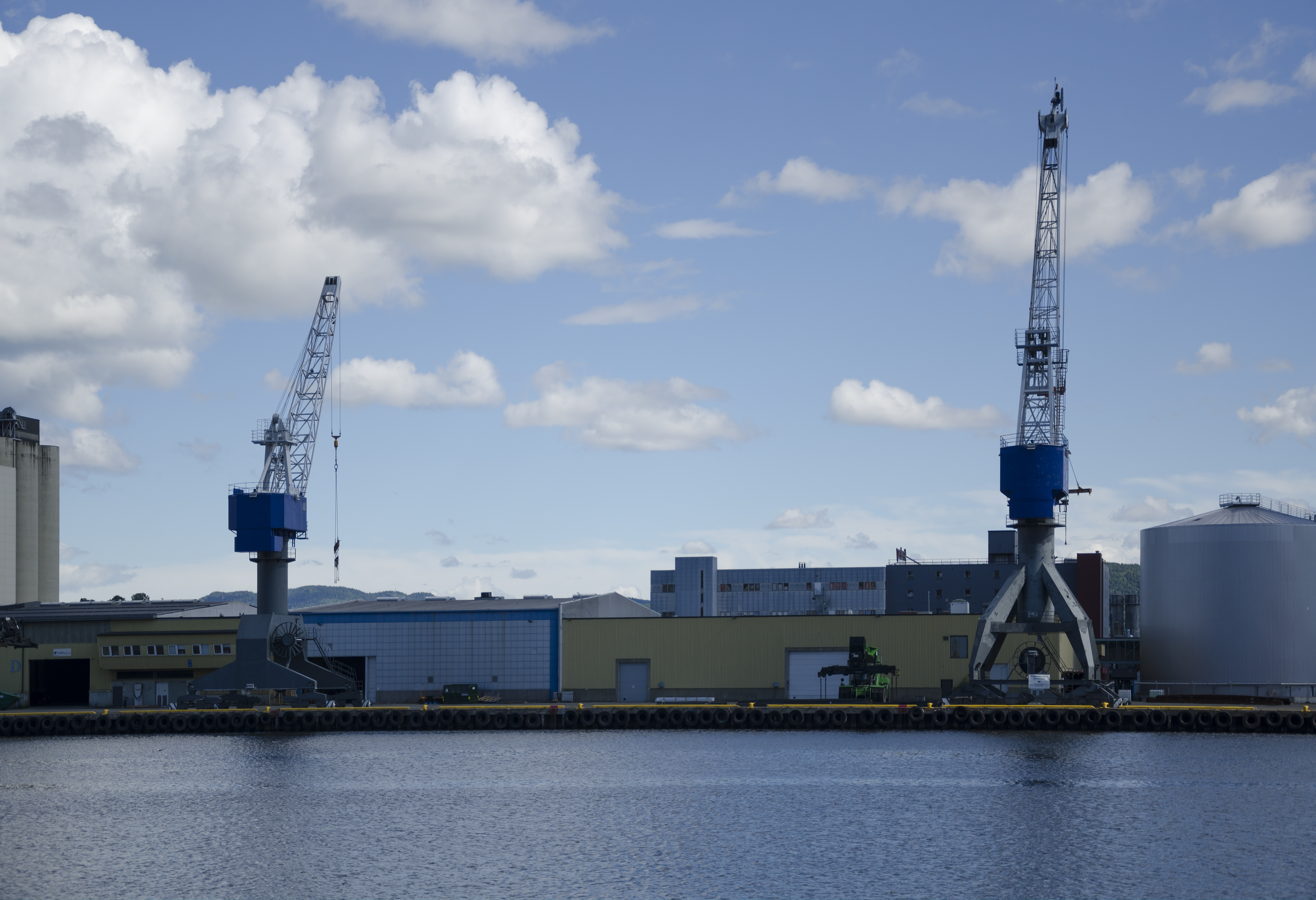
Docks

The location of Holmen, at the mouth of the river, makes it crucial for the transport infrastructure of Drammen. National road RV291 connects Bragernes and Strømsø with road bridges to Holmen. Furthermore, the pillars of Norway's longest bridge, Drammen Bridge (European route E18), rest on the island. Finally, the railroad artery Drammensbanen crosses Holmen, with side tracks leading to the docks. The dual railroad bridges are also the longest in Norway, and the first was built in 1872.

== Gallery ==
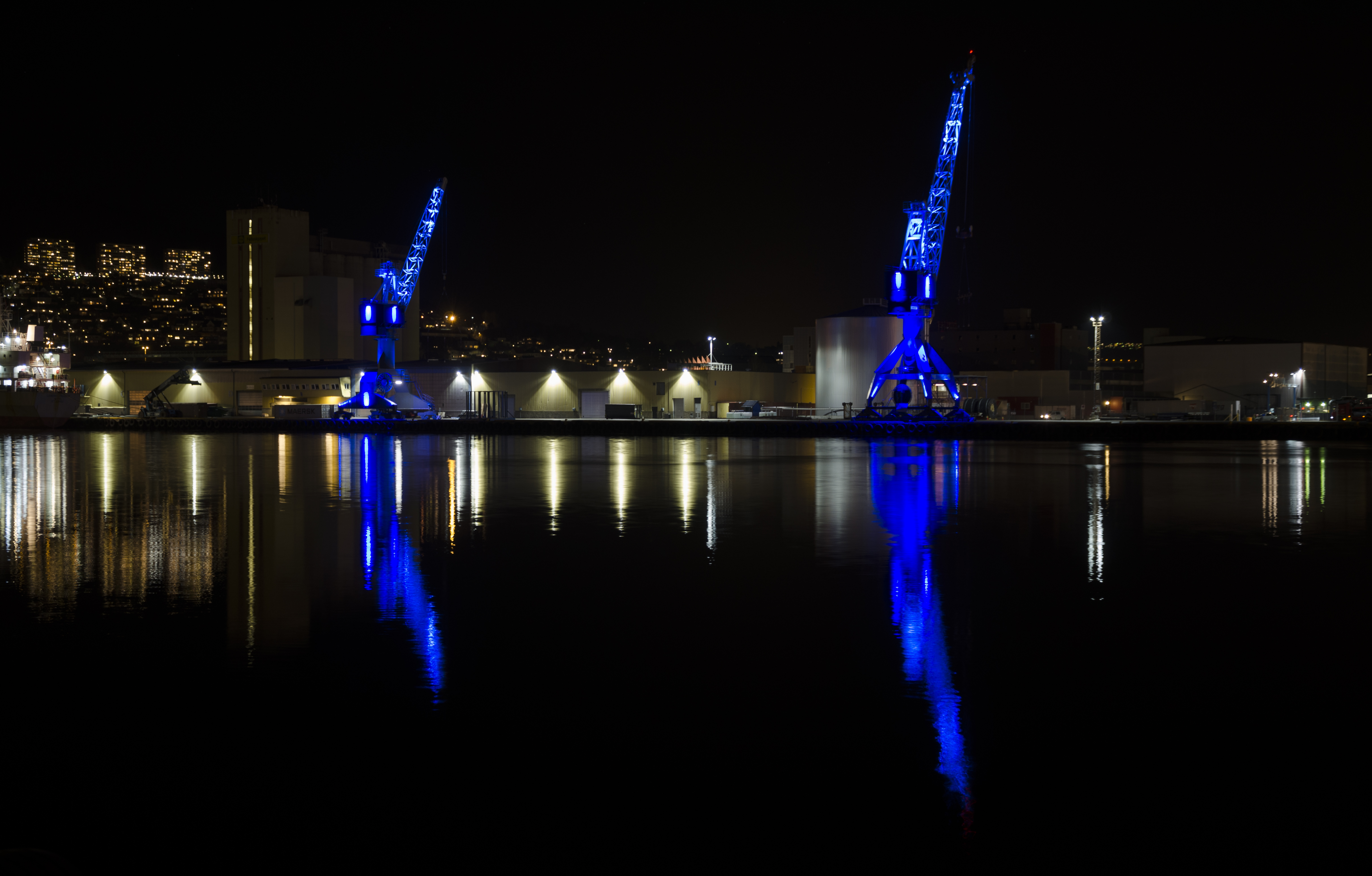
Docks at night

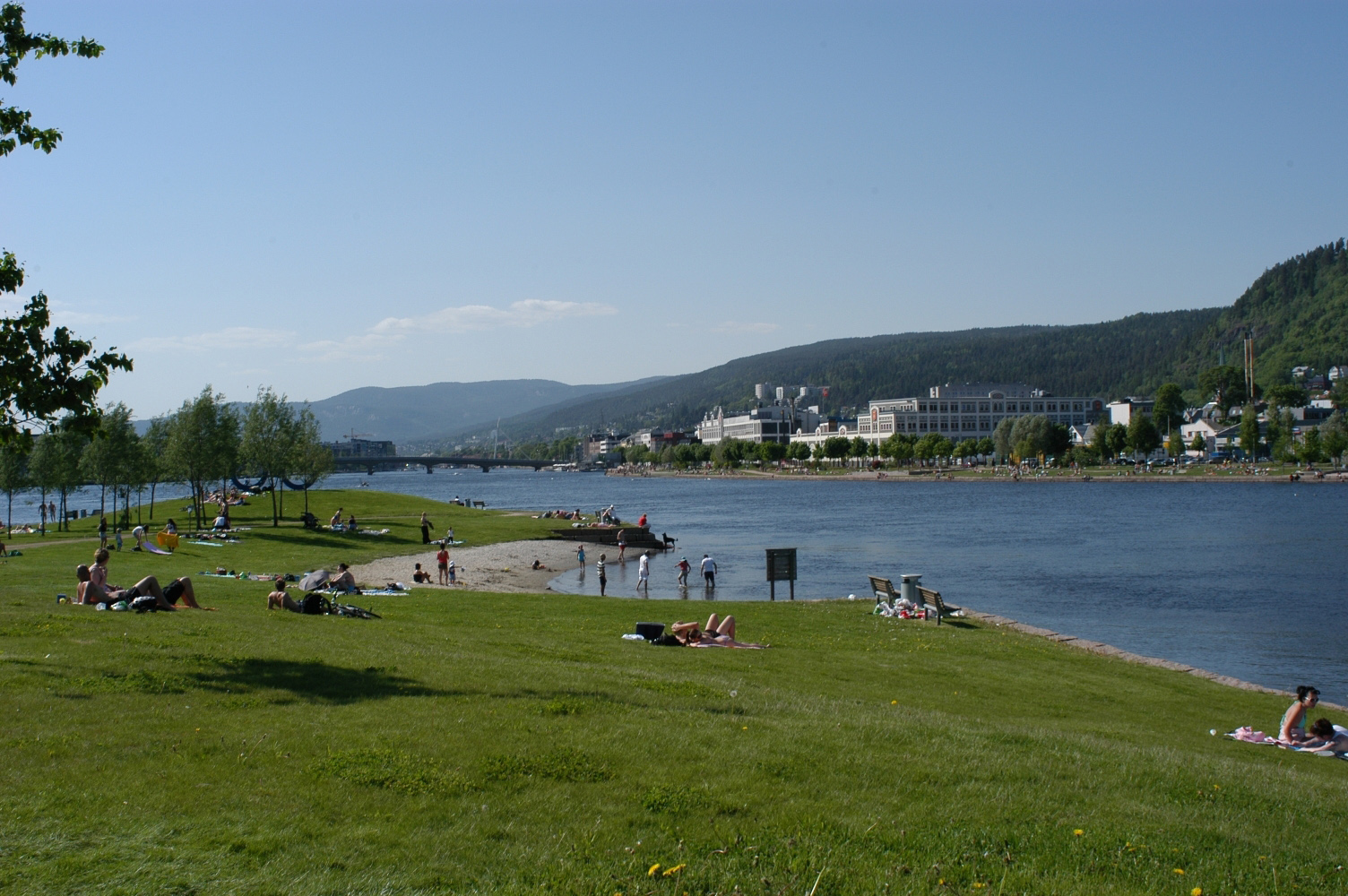
Western end of the island, Holmenokken, is a public park

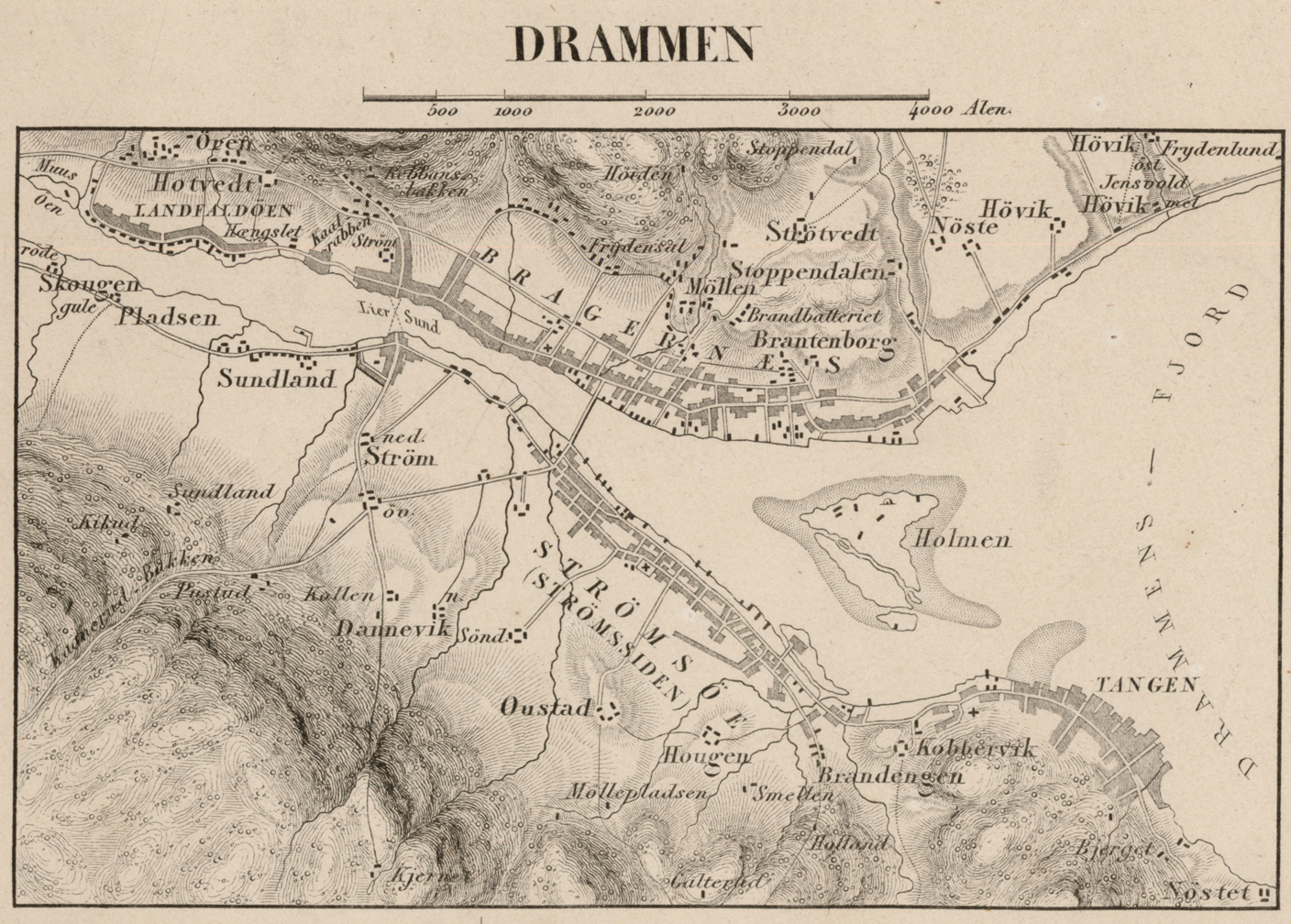
This historical map from 1854 shows Holmen as being much smaller than today, and an archipelago.

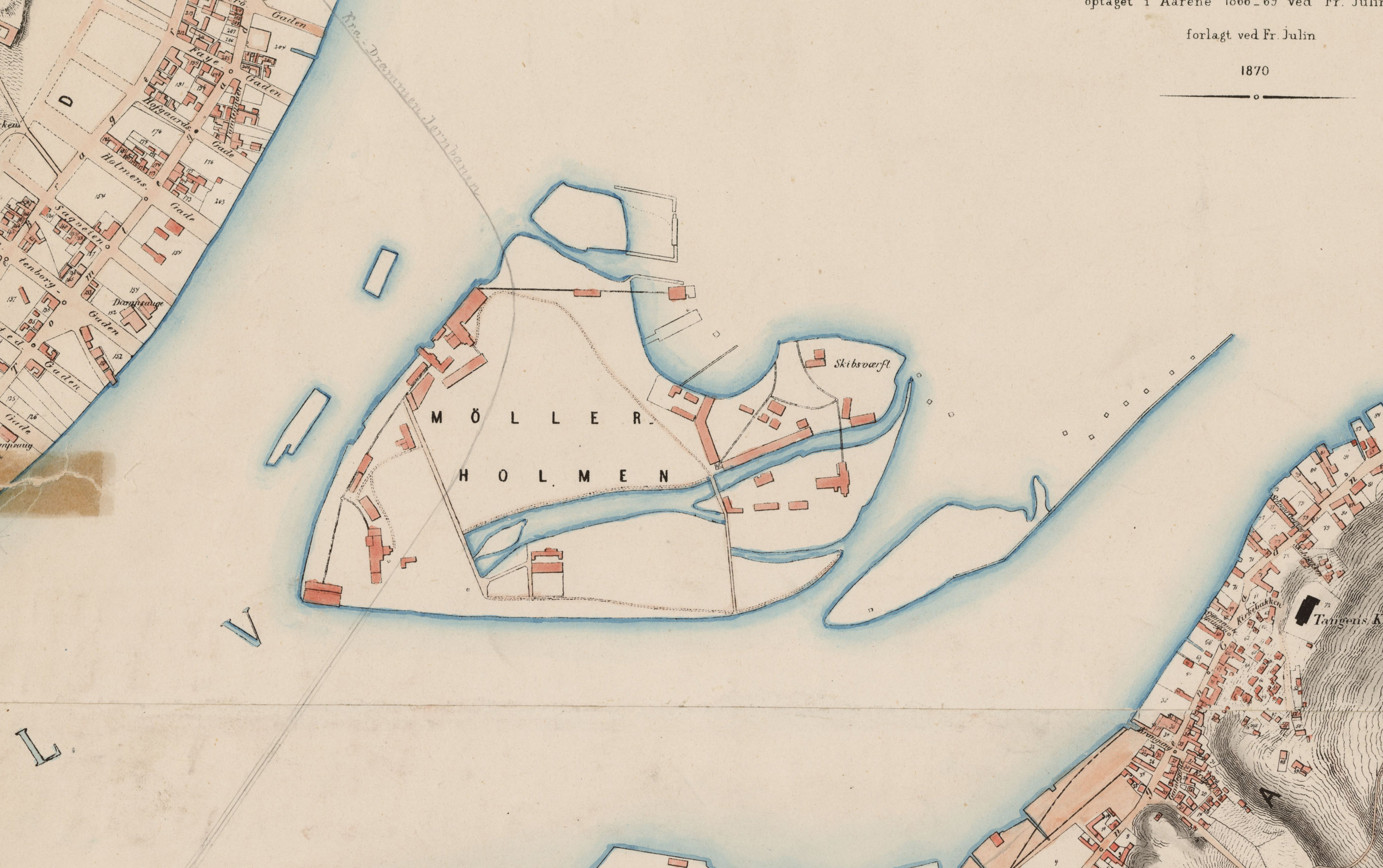
This 1870 map shows the planned railroad bridge (finished in 1872) and various industry on the island.

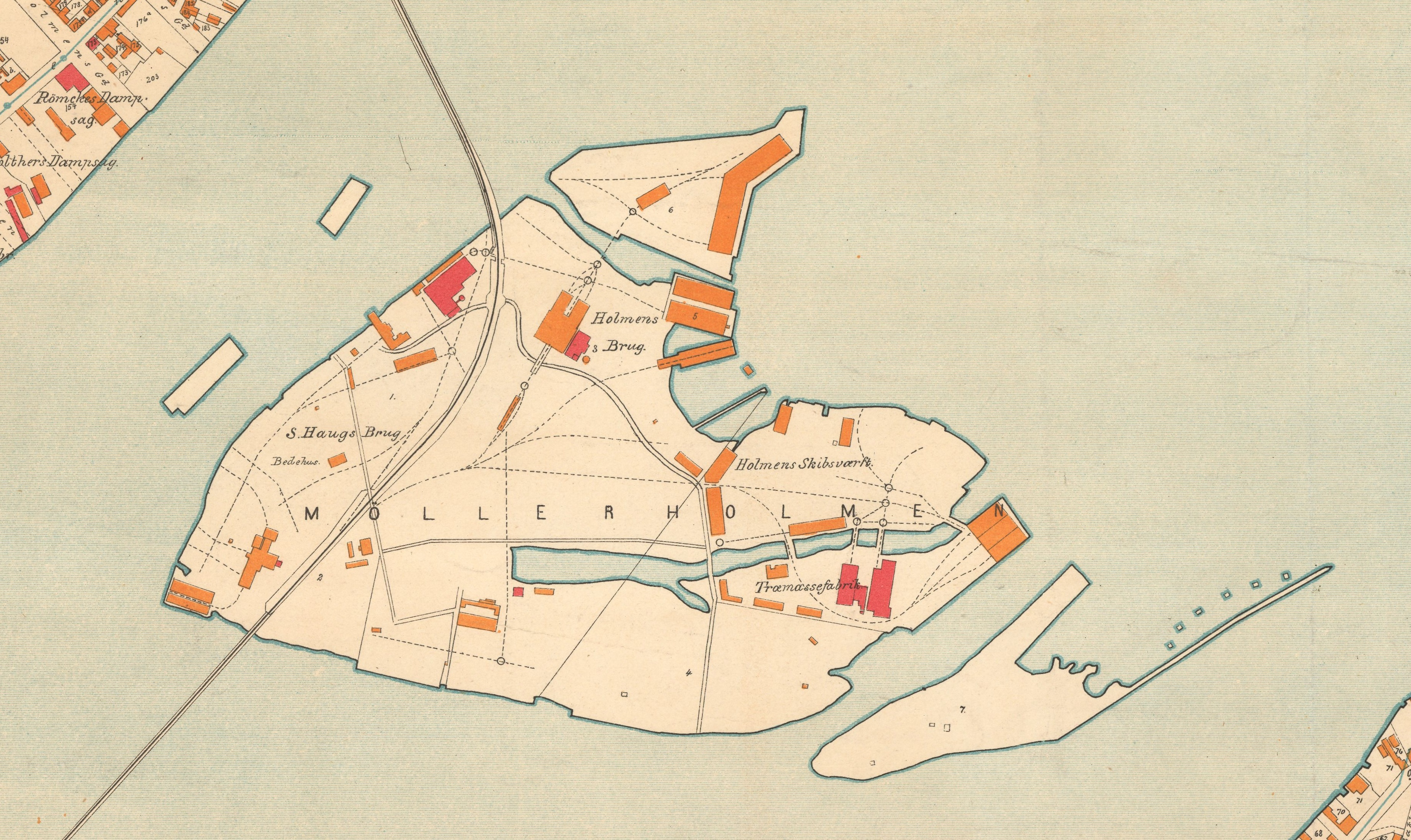
This 1888 map reveal an increased area of the island due to mass deposits, as well as increased industry, and the finished railroad with side tracks to the ports.

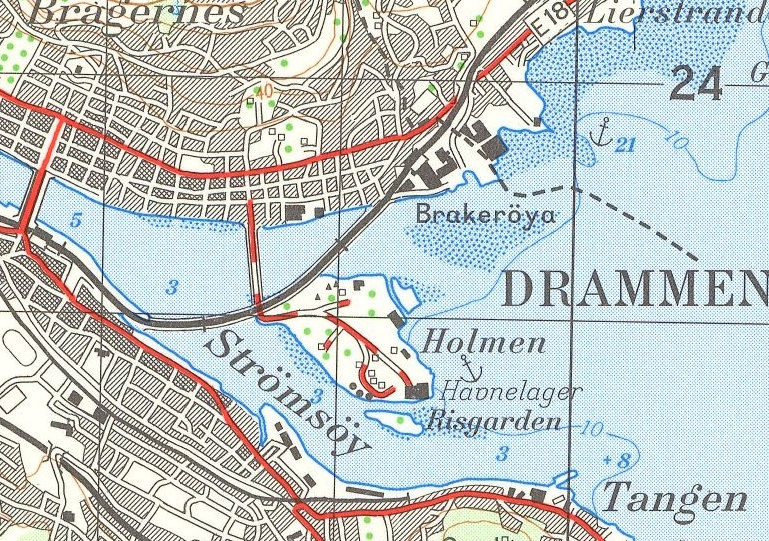
Holmen, 1966, with new car road to the mainland in the north
