= List of shipwrecks in March 1831 =

The list of shipwrecks in March 1831 includes ships sunk, foundered, grounded, or otherwise lost during March 1831.

== 3 March ==
List of shipwrecks: 3 March 1831
| Ship | State | Description |
|---|---|---|
| Trafalgar | United Kingdom | The ship was wrecked on Terceira, Azores, Portugal with the loss of three of her crew. |

== 5 March ==
List of shipwrecks: 5 March 1831
| Ship | State | Description |
|---|---|---|
| West India | United Kingdom | The ship was wrecked on the Bonavista Reef. Her crew were rescued by Duckenfield (United Kingdom). West India was on a voyage from Liverpool, Lancashire to the Cape of Good Hope and Mauritius. |

== 6 March ==
List of shipwrecks: 6 March 1831
| Ship | State | Description |
|---|---|---|
| Carlisle | United Kingdom | The ship was wrecked on the Hale Sand, in the North Sea off the coast of Lincolnshire. She was on a voyage from Cardiff, Glamorgan to Blyth, Northumberland. |

== 8 March ==
List of shipwrecks: 8 March 1831
| Ship | State | Description |
|---|---|---|
| Cicero | United Kingdom | The ship was driven ashore at Berck-sur-Mer, Pas-de-Calais, France. She was on a voyage from Málaga, Spain to Hull, Yorkshire. |
| Phæton | United Kingdom | The ship was driven ashore and wrecked in Warden Bay, Isle of Wight. She was on a voyage from Saint-Malo, Ille-et-Vilaine, France to Southampton, Hampshire. |

== 9 March ==
List of shipwrecks: 9 March 1831
| Ship | State | Description |
|---|---|---|
| Ann | United Kingdom | The ship was wrecked on Eierland, North Holland, Netherlands. Her crew were rescued. She was on a voyage from Hull, Yorkshire to Memel, Prussia. |

== 10 March ==
List of shipwrecks: 10 March 1831
| Ship | State | Description |
|---|---|---|
| Frances | United Kingdom | The ship was wrecked on Anegada, Virgin Islands. She was on a voyage from Jamaica to Bristol, Gloucestershire. |
| Pomona | United Kingdom | The sloop was driven ashore and wrecked at Peterhead, Aberdeenshire. Her crew were rescued. |

== 12 March ==
List of shipwrecks: 12 March 1831
| Ship | State | Description |
|---|---|---|
| Barrow | United Kingdom | The ship was driven ashore at "Redness Point". She was on a voyage from Garlieston, Wigtownshire to Ulverston, Lancashire. |
| Betsey | United Kingdom | The ship was driven ashore at Workington, Cumberland. |
| Britannia | United Kingdom | The brig foundered in the Irish Sea off The Skerries, Anglesey with the loss of all hands. She was on a voyage from Waterford to Liverpool. |
| Eliza | United Kingdom | The ship was wrecked in the Atlantic Ocean. She was set afire and abandoned. Eliza was on a voyage from Saint John, New Brunswick, British North America to Cork. |
| Jenny | United Kingdom | The ship sprang a leak and was abandoned. Her crew were rescued. She was on a voyage from Pillau, Prussia to London. |
| Little John | United Kingdom | The ship was wrecked at Portpatrick, Wigtownshire with the loss of all but one of her those on board. She was on a voyage from Cork to Glasgow. Renfrewshire. |
| New John | United Kingdom | The ship was wrecked near Belfast, County Antrim. |
| Robet and Isabella | United Kingdom | The ship foundered in Boylagh Bay with the loss of all hands. |
| St. Peter | United Kingdom | The ship was driven ashore at Workington. |
| Travellers | United Kingdom | The ship was in collision with Sylph in the Irish Sea and was abandoned. She was on a voyage from Liverpool, Lancashire to Cork. |

== 13 March ==
List of shipwrecks: 13 March 1831
| Ship | State | Description |
|---|---|---|
| Castle | United Kingdom | The ship was wrecked near Ullapool, Ross-shire. |
| Free Mason | United Kingdom | The ship was wrecked near Ullapool. |
| Harriet | United Kingdom | The brig was wrecked south of Corsewall Point, Wigtownshire. Her crew were rescued. She was on a voyage from Greenock, Renfrewshire to Demerara. |
| James Daly | United Kingdom | The ship was driven ashore in Loch Indaal. She was on a voyage from Glasgow, Renfrewshire to Faial, Azores, Portugal. |
| Paddy Carey | United Kingdom | The ship was wrecked in Dingle Bay. Her crew were rescued. She was on a voyage from Charleston, South Carolina to Liverpool, Lancashire. |

== 14 March ==
List of shipwrecks: 14 March 1831
| Ship | State | Description |
|---|---|---|
| Ann | United Kingdom | The ship sank at Liverpool, Lancashire. |
| Harriet | United Kingdom | The ship was wrecked at Portpatrick, Wigtownshire. She was on a voyage from Greenock, Renfrewshire to Demerara. |

== 15 March ==
List of shipwrecks: 15 March 1831
| Ship | State | Description |
|---|---|---|
| Argyle | United Kingdom | The ship was wrecked on the North Bull Rock, off Dublin. |
| Atlantic | United Kingdom | The ship, a "bilyboy", was wrecked on the Pudding Pie Sand, in the Humber with the loss of all four people on board. She was on a voyage from Boston, Lincolnshire to Hull, Yorkshire. |

== 16 March ==
List of shipwrecks: 16 March 1831
| Ship | State | Description |
|---|---|---|
| Betsey and Sophia | United Kingdom | The whaler was wrecked on Desolation Land. Fifteen of her crew survived. |
| Eleanor | United Kingdom | The ship was in collision with Dolphin (United Kingdom) in the North Sea off the coast of Aberdeenshire and foundered. Her crew were rescued by Dolphin. Eleanor was on a voyage from Liverpool, Lancashire to Newcastle upon Tyne, Northumberland. |
| Henry | United Kingdom | The ship was wrecked off Benbecula, Hebrides. Her crew were rescued. She was on a voyage from Liverpool, Lancashire to Charleston, South Carolina, United States. |
| Frolic | United Kingdom | The paddle steamer was wrecked on the Nash Sand, in the Bristol Channel with the loss of all 36 passengers and crew. She was on a voyage from Milford Haven, Pembrokeshire to Bristol, Gloucestershire. |
| Minstrel | United Kingdom | The ship was wrecked on Ameland, Friesland, Netherlands. She was on a voyage from Liverpool to Leer, Kingdom of Hanover. |

== 17 March ==
List of shipwrecks: 17 March 1831
| Ship | State | Description |
|---|---|---|
| Clyde | United Kingdom | The ship caught fire at Holyhead, Anglesey and was scuttled. |
| Harmonie | Netherlands | The ship was driven ashore on Texel, North Holland. She was on a voyage from Harlingen, Friesland to Liverpool, Lancashire, United Kingdom. |

== 18 March ==
List of shipwrecks: 18 March 1831
| Ship | State | Description |
|---|---|---|
| Fraer Catherina | Prussia | The ship foundered in the North Sea off Stavanger, Rogaland, Norway. Her crew were rescued. She was on a voyage from Pillau to London, United Kingdom. |

== 19 March ==
List of shipwrecks: 19 March 1831
| Ship | State | Description |
|---|---|---|
| Atalanta | United Kingdom | The ship was wrecked in the Humber with the loss of all hands. She was on a voyage from Boston, Lincolnshire to Hull, Yorkshire. |
| Eleanor | United Kingdom | The ship was wrecked at Memel, Prussia. |
| Erasmus | United Kingdom | The brig was driven ashore and wrecked at "Bulin", Northumberland. |
| Peter | United Kingdom | The sloop was wrecked on Hilbre Island, Cheshire with the loss of all five people on board. She was on a voyage from Connah's Quay, Flintshire to Conwy, Caernarfonshire. |

== 22 March ==
List of shipwrecks: 22 March 1831
| Ship | State | Description |
|---|---|---|
| Betsey | United Kingdom | The ship was wrecked on the Nore Sand, in the Thames Estuary. |
| Jong Jacob | Hamburg | The ship was in collision with the steamship Monarch and was consequently beached at Hamburg. She was on a voyage from Hamburg to Newcastle upon Tyne, Northumberland, United Kingdom. |

== 23 March ==
List of shipwrecks: 23 March 1831
| Ship | State | Description |
|---|---|---|
| Phillipina | Stolp | The ship foundered in the Baltic Sea off Stolp. She was on a voyage from Stolpe to Newcastle upon Tyne, Northumberland, United Kingdom. |
| San José | Spain | The ship foundered at sea. She was on a voyage from Bilbao to Plymouth, Devon, United Kingdom. |
| Saratoga | United States | The ship sprang a leak and was abandoned in the Atlantic Ocean (25°46′N 46°30′W). Her crew survived. She was on a voyage from Liverpool, Lancashire, United Kingdom to Savannah, Georgia. |
| Sprightly | United Kingdom | The ship was wrecked on Gran Canaria, Canary Isles, Spain. She was on a voyage from London to Saint Thomas, Virgin Islands. |
| William Peile | United States | The ship was driven ashore and wrecked at Plymouth. She was on a voyage from Charleston, South Carolina to Plymouth. |

== 24 March ==
List of shipwrecks: 24 March 1831
| Ship | State | Description |
|---|---|---|
| Candida | Spain | The brig sank at Tonga with the loss of nine lives. |
| Caroline | United Kingdom | The whaler foundered in the Pacific Ocean off Tonga. |
| Newcastle | United Kingdom | The ship was wrecked at Mazara del Vallo, Sicily. Her crew were rescued. She was on a voyage fropm Odesa to Portsmouth, Hampshire via Constantinople, Ottoman Empire. |

== 25 March ==
List of shipwrecks: 25 March 1831
| Ship | State | Description |
|---|---|---|
| Henry Carter | United Kingdom | The ship was destroyed by fire whilst on a voyage from Port-au-Prince, Haiti to Falmouth, Cornwall. Her crew survived. |
| Telford | United Kingdom | The smack foundered in the Irish Sea off Parkgate, Cheshire with the loss of two of her four crew. She was on a voyage from Beaumaris, Anglesey to Liverpool, Lancashire. |

== 28 March ==
List of shipwrecks: 28 March 1831
| Ship | State | Description |
|---|---|---|
| Ann | United Kingdom | The ship was lost on the coast of Norway. |
| August | United Kingdom | The ship was wrecked on the Kentish Knock, in the North Sea off the coast of Kent with the loss of nine of her crew. She was on a voyage from Dunkirk, Nord, France to an Irish port. |

== 30 March ==
List of shipwrecks: 30 March 1831
| Ship | State | Description |
|---|---|---|
| Manning | United Kingdom | The ship was driven ashore and wrecked 12 nautical miles (22 km) east of Blankenberge, West Flanders, Belgium. Her crew were rescued. She was on a voyage from London to Antwerp, Belgium. |

== 31 March ==
List of shipwrecks: 31 March 1831
| Ship | State | Description |
|---|---|---|
| St. Joseph | (United Kingdom of Great Britain and Ireland) Dominica | The sloop was wrecked at Dominica. |

== Unknown date ==
List of shipwrecks: Unknown date 1831
| Ship | State | Description |
|---|---|---|
| Arrow | United Kingdom | The ship was wrecked at Maughold Head, Isle of Man before 22 March. |
| Delight | United Kingdom | The ship was driven ashore at Ballyshannon, County Antrim. |
| Elizabeth | United Kingdom | The ship ran aground near Lista, Vest-Agder, Norway before 16 March. Her crew were rescued. |
| Jane | United Kingdom | The sloop was lost at Little Haven, Pembrokeshire. She was on a voyage from Caernarfon to Swansea, Glamorgan Jane was refloated on 13 April but subsequently sank again. She was refloated again in late May and taken in to Little Haven for temporary repairs, prior to being taken to Milford Haven for permanent repairs. |
