= Tranmere (1819 ship) =

History

United Kingdom
- Name: Tranmere
- Namesake: Tranmere, Merseyside
- Builder: Tranmere
- Launched: 1819
- Fate: Last listed 1837

General characteristics
- Tons burthen: 180, or 186 (bm)

Tranmere was launched in 1819 at Tranmere. She first traded between England and South America. In 1827 she played a role in the settlement of Tasmania and thereafter sailed in the region and between England and Tasmania. She was last listed in 1837.

== Career ==
Tranmere first entered Lloyd's Register (LR) in 1819 with F.Cooke, master, Tayleur, owner, and trade Liverpool–Buenos Aires.

On 9 March 1821 Tranmere, Hasler, master, had to put back to Liverpool. She had started on her way to Valparaiso when she ran aground on the Arklow Bank. On 8 June Tranmere, Stroyan, master, was reported at 22°26′N 30°8′W on her way from Liverpool to Valparaiso.

Year	Master	Owner	Trade	Source
1823	S.Harler; B.Stroyan	Tayleur & Co.	Liverpool–Valparaiso	LR; damages repaired 1821
1825	R.Thompson	J.Marshall	Liverpool–Santa Lucia	LR; damages repaired 1821

On 21 April 1826 Tranmere, Captain T. Burton, sailed from England for Van Diemen's Land. She brought out to Van Diemen's Land much of the initial cargo, stock, and farm labourers for the newly-formed Van Diemen's Land Company. In particular, she carried 50 Cotswold sheep – 10 rams and 40 ewes – which apparently were the first sheep in Tasmania.

While she was working for the Company she also at some point carried the colourful adventurer Jørgen Jørgensen from Launceston to George Town. Tranmere returned to England via Bengal.

Year	Master	Owner	Trade	Source & notes
1827	Burton	Ellice & Co.	London–New South Wales	LR; damages repaired 1821
1830	J.Smith	J.Smith	London–Van Diemen's Land	LR; damages repaired 1821

Tranmere left London on 23 June 1829 and arrived in Sydney on 19 December. In 1830 Tranmere was in the Pacific Ocean, where she visited Tongataboo. There she took on the crew of the whaler L'Aigle, which had wrecked on 6 March, and carried them to Sydney. Either prior or after this, Tranmere sailed to New Zealand. She was at Kapiti Island, from where she sailed to Cook Strait. Tranmere, Smith, master, arrived at Cook Strait on 24 June with 17 tons of flax. Tranmere sailed back to England in January 1831.

Year	Master	Owner	Trade	Source & notes
1835	J.Smith		London	LR

== Fate ==
Tranmere was last listed in Lloyd's Register in 1837 with stale data.
