= KulturNav =

Norwegian service hosting name authorities

KulturNav is a Norwegian cloud-based software service, allowing users to create, manage and distribute name authorities and terminology, focusing on the needs of museums and other cultural heritage institutions. The software is developed by KulturIT ANS and the development project is funded by the Arts Council Norway.

KulturNav is designed to enhance access to heritage information in archives, libraries and museums, working across institutions with common metadata. Thus many institutions can collaborate to build up a list of standard naming and terminology. The metadata is published as linked open data (LOD), which can be linked further against other LOD resources. The application programming interface (API) currently supports HTTP GET requests to read data. API calls are currently not authenticated or authorized. This means that the system returns only published content that is readable by any user. The system was developed within Play Framework together with Solr and jQuery.

The company KulturIT, launched in 2013, is owned by five Norwegian and one Swedish museum. It is a non-profit organisation with all surplus going to development.

The website was launched on 20 January 2015 and is currently being used by approximately 130 museums in Norway, Sweden and Åland. In March 2015 the Swedish national register of photography was in the process of being transferred to the KulturNav site. A register of Swedish architects is also available through Kulturnav.
