= L'Aigle (1802 ship) =

French (1801–1809), and UK merchant ship (1810–1830)

History

France
- Name: L'Aigle
- Namesake: Eagle
- Launched: 1801, or 1802, or 1803
- Captured: 1809

United Kingdom
- Name: L'Aigle
- Acquired: 1810 by purchase of a prize
- Fate: Wrecked on 6 March 1830

General characteristics
- Tons burthen: 466, or 475, or 476 (bm)
- Length: 114 ft 6 in (34.9 m)
- Armament: 10 × 6-pounder guns + 2 × 2-pounder carronades

L'Aigle (or Aigle, or Eagle) was launched in France in 1801, 1802, or 1803. The British Royal Navy captured her in 1809. From 1810 to 1817, she was a West Indiaman. From 1817 L'Aigle made four complete voyages as a whaler in the British Southern Whale fishery. On her third whaling voyage, she carried King Kamehameha II of Hawaii and Queen Kamāmalu with a number of their retainers and Hawaiian notables to England. She was lost on 6 March 1830 on her fifth whaling voyage.

== West Indiaman ==
L'Aigle first appeared in Lloyd's Register (LR) in 1810. It gave her master and owner as [C.C.] Parish, and her trade as London–Jamaica.

L'Aigle capsized and sank on 13 August 1813 in the West India Docks, London. She was pumped dry, refloated, and put into dock at Limehouse within three days.

Year	Master	Owner	Trade	Source & notes
1813	Sims	Parish & Co.	London–Jamaica; Wales	LR; large repair 1809 & damages repaired 1813
1818	R.Poole	Boulcott	London–South Seas	LR; large repair 1809 & damages repaired 1813

== Whaler ==
From 1817, L'Aigle made four complete voyages as a whaler in the British Southern Whale fishery, and was lost in 1830 on her fifth.

1st whaling voyage 1817–1819): Captain Robert Poole (or Pool) sailed from England on 12 July 1817. L'Aigle returned on 4 January 1819 with 650 casks of oil.

2nd whaling voyage 1819–1821): Captain Valentine Starbuck sailed from England on 6 April 1819, bound for the Sandwich Islands. L'Aigle returned on 6 July 1821 with a full ship of 550 casks and 14 tanks.

3rd whaling voyage 1822–1824): Captain Starbuck sailed from England on 7 January 1822, bound for the Sandwich Islands. In May 1822 she spoke Grace at Charles Island. In June L'Aigle was off Peru while in the company of Spring Grove. L'Aigle was at Oahu, Fanning Atoll, at Maui, and off Japan. She returned home via Rio de Janeiro and arrived back in England on 2 May 1824 with 550 casks.

On this voyage, in 1823, Starbuck sighted Starbuck Island, which he named Volunteer Island. Captain George Anson Byron, of HMS Blonde, sighted the island in 1825 and renamed it Starbuck Island.

When he sailed back to England, Starbuck brought with him King Kamehameha II of Hawaii, Queen Kamāmalu, and a party of ten notables and retainers. L'Aigle sailed on 27 November 1823. When L'Aigle stopped at Rio de Janeiro in February 1824, Kamehameha met Emperor Pedro I. The Royal party disembarked at Portsmouth on 17 May. They were to meet with King George IV on 21 June, but they fell ill with measles. They died before they could meet him. Queen Kamāmalu died on 8 July and King Kamehameha II died on 14 July. L'Aigle's owners dismissed Starbuck and sued him for having cut his whaling voyage short to bring the Hawaiians to England. (Note: HMS Blonde repatriated the remains of the royal couple. She left England on 8 September 1824 and arrived at Honolulu on 6 May 1825.)

4th whaling voyage 1825–1827): Captain Dixon sailed from England on 20 May 1825, bound for the Pacific. L'Aigle was reported at Honolulu and Tahiti. She returned to England on 24 October 1827 with 700 casks, plus fins and 34 seal skins.

== Fate ==
Captain Dixon received custom's clearance on 25 February 1828 to sail to the south seas. L'Aigle was reported at the Seychelles and then the Sandwich Islands. During the voyage Dixon may have died, with Captain John Powell replacing him.

L'Aigle wrecked on 6 March 1830 on a reef 10 to 15 miles NE of Tongataboo. Her crew took to her boats and all were saved. However, her cargo of some 1630 barrels (200 tons) of oil were lost. Tranmere carried the crew from Tongataboo to Sydney.
