= Grace (1814 ship) =

History

United Kingdom
- Name: Grace
- Builder: New York
- Launched: 1812
- Acquired: 1814 by purchase of a prize
- Fate: Abandoned sinking in May 1823

General characteristics
- Tons burthen: 194, or 197, or 208 (bm)
- Complement: 13 (1823)
- Armament: 1 × 12-pounder + 2 × 9-pounder guns

Grace was launched in New York in 1812. She was taken in prize circa 1814. She then became a Falmouth, Cornwall, packet, sailing for the Post Office. She primarily sailed to New York via Halifax and Bermuda, but also sailed to the Mediterranean and Brazil. She twice encountered American privateers, repelling one and outpacing the other. In 1821 she sailed on a seal and whale hunting voyage to the South Shetland Islands and the coast of Chile. She foundered in the South Atlantic circa May 1823 while homeward bound.

== Career ==
Grace first appeared in Lloyd's Register in 1814 with G.Vivian, master, Bullock & Co., owners, and trade Falmouth packet.

Year	Master	Owner	Trade	Source
1815	G.Vivian	Bullock & Co.	Falmouth packet	LR

=== Falmouth packet ===
The list of voyages below is not complete.

Grace arrived at Falmouth on 1 October 1814 to take mail to the West Indies. On 25 October she repulsed an attack by an American privateer in which Grace had three men killed. She arrived at Barbados on 27 October. Grace, Thompson, master, arrived back at Falmouth on 2 January 1815. She had engaged an American privateer brig of 16 guns on 10 October, but suffered little damage and no casualties. (Whether this is the same or a separate incident from that on 25 October is not clear.) On 10 November she was at Guadaloupe. On the 19th she left St Kitts and on the 28th she left Tortola. On the 30th she left St Thomas. On 4 December an American privateer schooner chased her, but could not catch her. On the 22nd a gale and heavy seas took away her bowsprit and mizzenmast, stove in her boat, and did other damage.

Grace left Falmouth 27 October 1815, bound for Surinam. She arrived there in December and then sailed for Demerara. On 12 December she sailed from Demerara for Dominica. She left Dominica on 26 December and arrived at Cork on 29 January 1816. She arrived back at Falmouth on 8 February.

Grace left Falmouth on 14 June 1816. She was at Halifax, Nova Scotia between 26 and 28 July, and arrived at New York city on 7 August. she sailed from New York on 8 September and arrived at Halifax again on September. She left Halifax o on the 19th and arrived back at Falmouth on 15 October.

Grace left Falmouth on 14 November and arrived at Bermuda on 16 November. She sailed from Bermuda on 30 November and arrived at New York on 27 December. She sailed from New York on 22 February 1817 and arrived at Falmouth on 13 March. She did not stop at Halifax on her homeward-bound leg as while she was in New York a Royal Navy sloop had brought the mails from Halifax for Falmouth.

On 31 March 1817 Grace sailed with mails for Gibraltar and Malta. She arrived at Gibraltar on 10 March and sailed for Malta on the 13th. She arrived at Malta on 7 May. She sailed from Malta on 26 May and Gibraltar on 9 June, arriving back at Falmouth on 25 June.

Grace left Falmouth on 10 July 1817 and arrived at Halifax on 19 August. She sailed from Halifax on 29 August and arrived at New York on 29 August. She left New York on 10 October and arrived at Halifax on the 15th. She left Halifax on the 23rd and arrived back at Falmouth on 5 December.

Grace left Falmouth on 20 December 1817 and arrived at Bermuda on 23 January 1818. She left Bermuda on 27 January and arrived at New York on 8 February. She left New York on 9 March and arrived at Halifax on 15 March. She left Halifax on 24 March and arrived back at Falmouth on 15 April. On her way home after leaving New York she encountered in latitude 42° an island of ice some seven leagues (approx. 38 kilometers) long and 3,000 ft (914 m) high.

On 14 June 1818 Grace arrived at Barbados from Falmouth. She sailed from Jamaica on 13 July and arrived back at Falmouth on 1 August.

Grace left Falmouth on 21 October 1818 and arrived at Madeira on 3 November. She left the next day, and stopped at Pernambuco (on 2 December) and Salvador, Bahia, before arriving at Rio de Janeiro on 14 December. She left Rio on 7 January 1819 and arrived back at Falmouth on 15 March.

Grace left Falmouth on 15 June 1819 and arrived at Halifax on 15 July. She left Halifax on 20 July and arrived at New York on the 28th. She left New York on 4 September and arrived at Halifax on the 10th. She left Halifax on 16 September and arrived back at Falmouth on 13 October.

=== Seal hunting and whaling ===
Seal hunting had begun in the South Shetland Islands in late 1819 and Grace's owners decided to pursue the opportunity.

Year	Master	Owner	Trade	Source
1822	H.Rowe	Bullock & Co.	Plymouth–South Seas	LR; raised 1816 old materials, & large repair 1821

On 16 June 1821 Captain Henry Rowe sailed from Plymouth, bound for the South Shetlands. She was reported to have been there on 3 February 1822 and to have gathered 1100 seal skins and 20 tons of seal oil. Rowe then sailed for the Galápagos Islands. She was reported to have been there on 5 May. On 5 May she spoke L'Aigle at Charles Island. Grace was reported to have been at Santa María Island, Chile (St Mary's) on 2 March 1823 with 20 barrels of sperm oil, 145 barrels whale oil, and 2700 skins.

== Fate ==
On 17 June Henry Rowe and five crew members from Grace arrived at Buenos Aires. She had had a full cargo when they had had to abandon her at about 40°S 42°W as she was in a sinking state. Her mate and six more men, in another boat, had not yet arrived. The other seven arrived on 28 June.
