= French brig Euryale (1863) =

Génie-class brig of the French Navy

Euryale
History

France
- Name: Euryale
- Namesake: Euryale (Gorgon)
- Builder: Rochefort Dockyard
- Laid down: 31 October 1849
- Launched: 11 November 1863
- Commissioned: 9 February 1864
- Fate: Wrecked on 4 March 1870

General characteristics
- Class & type: Génie-class brig
- Tons burthen: 450 tons
- Draught: 13 ft (4.0 m)
- Armour: Timber

The Euryale French pronunciation: [ø.ʁjal] was a Génie-class brig of the French Navy. Begun in 1849 at Rochefort, construction was suspended in 1853 and not resumed for eight years. She was launched on 11 November 1863 and commissioned early the next year as a transport vessel. In 1867 she collided with an American ship in San Francisco harbour. The French government sued for damages which were initially awarded but, after a lengthy legal case that ended in the Supreme Court, the French crew were ruled to be jointly at fault and damages were split between the two parties.

The Euryale was wrecked on Starbuck Island in the Central Pacific on 4 March 1870.

== Background ==
The Génie class was designed to replace the Cygne-type brigs previously in service. The latter were good seakeeping vessels but considered slow and with their guns positioned too close to the waterline. The Génies were designed to a new hull plan, shorter in length but with a greater beam and depth. Their armament was changed from 18 × 24-pounder carronades to 16 × 30-pounder carronades.

== Construction ==
The Euryale was originally to have been built at Brest from 1849 but was switched to Rochefort at a late stage. She was built at Rochefort Dockyard by Jean Félix de Robert, Charles Louis Jay, Achille August Zani de Ferranty, Henri de Lisleferme and Auguste Émile Boden. Her keel was laid on 31 October 1849 but construction was suspended in 1853. Construction resumed in 1862 and in 1863 it was decided to complete her as a 250-ton transport vessel, to plans by E. Boden. Euryale was launched on 11 November 1863 and commissioned on 9 February 1864. She was completed in March 1864.

Euryale measured 450 tons burthen and drew 13 feet of water.

== Career ==
On the morning of 22 December 1867 the Euryale collided with the American vessel Sapphire in San Francisco harbor. In later court proceedings it was reported that the Euryale, had been anchored since 14 December around 600 yards (550 m) from the wharf and the Sapphire was anchored 300 yards to the southeast at around 18 December. The court papers record that a south-easterly wind blew up overnight on 21 December and by midnight had reached 6 knots in strength. They note that the wind strengthened to a gale by 5 am at which time the Sapphire, also affected by the changing tide, drifted and collided with the Euryale.

=== U.S. court case ===
A suit for damages was filed in the District Court against the owners of Sapphire on behalf of the Euryale's owner, Napoleon III, on 24 December. The French alleged that the Sapphire had failed to anchor securely and had anchored too close to the Euryale. The court ruled in favor of Napoleon and awarded $15,000 in damages. The defendants appealed the case to the Circuit Court and, after that also ruled against them appealed to the United States Supreme Court in July 1869. The Supreme Court met on the case from 16 February 1871.

The Supreme Court first considered whether Napoleon III, as Emperor of France, had any right to bring a case in the American courts because he could not be called as a witness as Admiralty law would allow in other cases. The justices noted that Euryale, as a French Navy vessel, would also not have been able to be inspected under an American warrant. The court decided that foreign sovereigns were as entitled as any other foreign person to bring cases.

A second point considered was whether the deposition of Napoleon in summer 1870 rendered the case void. The court ruled that the case was brought de facto in the name of the French government, not in that of the emperor personally, and ownership of it could be transferred to the French Third Republic, as had been the ownership of the Euryale. The judgement recognized the continuance of obligations by successor governments recognised by the United States.

The final point considered by the Supreme Court was the decisions of the inferior courts on the merits of the case. The Supreme Court considered that the distance the Sapphire anchored away from the Euryale was sufficient, as had been testified by experienced pilots, and no complaint had been made before the accident. However the Supreme Court agreed with the inferior courts that the Sapphire, by only using a single anchor, had failed to make herself secure. They found that the ship's second anchor had not been used until the first anchor had failed. The court found some failings with the actions taken by the crew of the Euryale, whose captain was not on board. The justices determined that her first officer had not been on deck since 11 pm and the third officer, called to the deck at 3 am, had failed to recognize the danger of the approaching Sapphire. They recorded that the third officer did not return to the deck until minutes before collision and that the action he ordered, hoisting of the jib, was correct but too late to avoid the collision. The court recorded that the Euryale's watchman made a report to his seniors between 4 am and 5 am notifying them of the danger posed by the approaching Sapphire. In its decision the court found both parties at fault, overturning the decisions of the inferior courts and ordered damages split equally between the two parties.

However, before the Supreme Court could render a verdict the Euryale was wrecked on Starbuck Island, an uninhabited reef in the Central Pacific, on 4 March 1870. She was commanded at the time by Lieutenant des Portes, future rear-admiral.
