= Climate change in American Samoa =

Climate change in the US territory of American Samoa

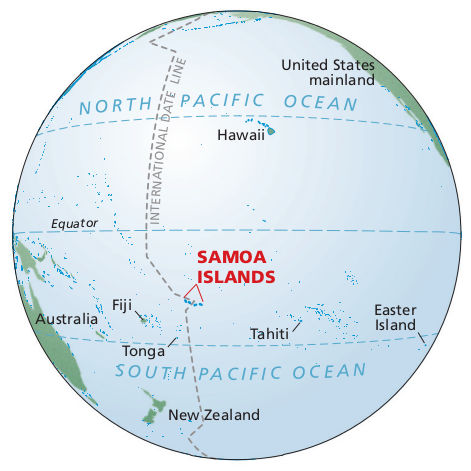
Locations of the Samoan Islands, including American Samoa.

Climate change in American Samoa encompasses the effects of climate change, attributed to man-made increases in atmospheric carbon dioxide, in the U.S. territory of American Samoa. The American Samoa Environmental Protection Agency (ASEPA) notes that the territory "has a fragile ecosystem" which is "directly and immediately impacted by global climate change".

The Human Rights Measurement Initiative finds that the climate crisis has worsened human rights conditions in American Samoa slightly (2.3 out of 6). Human rights experts provided that the climate crisis has affected shores, fishers and resource availability, and that only a small group of people are able to connect the climate crisis with existing human rights conditions.

== Effects of rising sea level ==
Due to the shoreline concentration of the population, rising sea levels are likely to destroy property and displace residents. "This increase in sea level means that anything that makes the ocean waves reach farther inland (such as a king tide or a tropical cyclone) will cause more flooding than when the sea level was lower. For example, a deadly tsunami struck American Samoa in 2009, and because of longterm sea level rise over the past century, it caused more damage than it would have if sea level had not been rising". Freshwater aquifers from which the local water supply is drawn are similarly threatened with seawater intrusion due to rising sea levels.

== Effects of temperature and weather changes ==
It has further been noted that climate change "warms nearshore waters causing the corals to bleach and/or die", with warm-water bleaching occurring annually by the mid-2010s, and with "significant bleaching events [having] occurred in 1994, 2002 and 2003". ASEPA similarly notes that "[c]limate change endangers the survival of our coral reefs", which help protect the island from hurricanes and support local fishing.

== Effects on health and disease ecology ==
In 2017, the NPS predicted a possible increase in mosquito-borne diseases such as dengue fever in tropical regions, including American Samoa, due to global warming, which "appears to be triggering a number of disease epidemics worldwide, involving a diversity of pathogens (viruses, bacteria, fungi, parasites) and a wide range of hosts", according to the NPS.

== See also ==
- Climate change in Tuvalu
