= Tuvalu Meteorological Service =

Tuvalu government agency

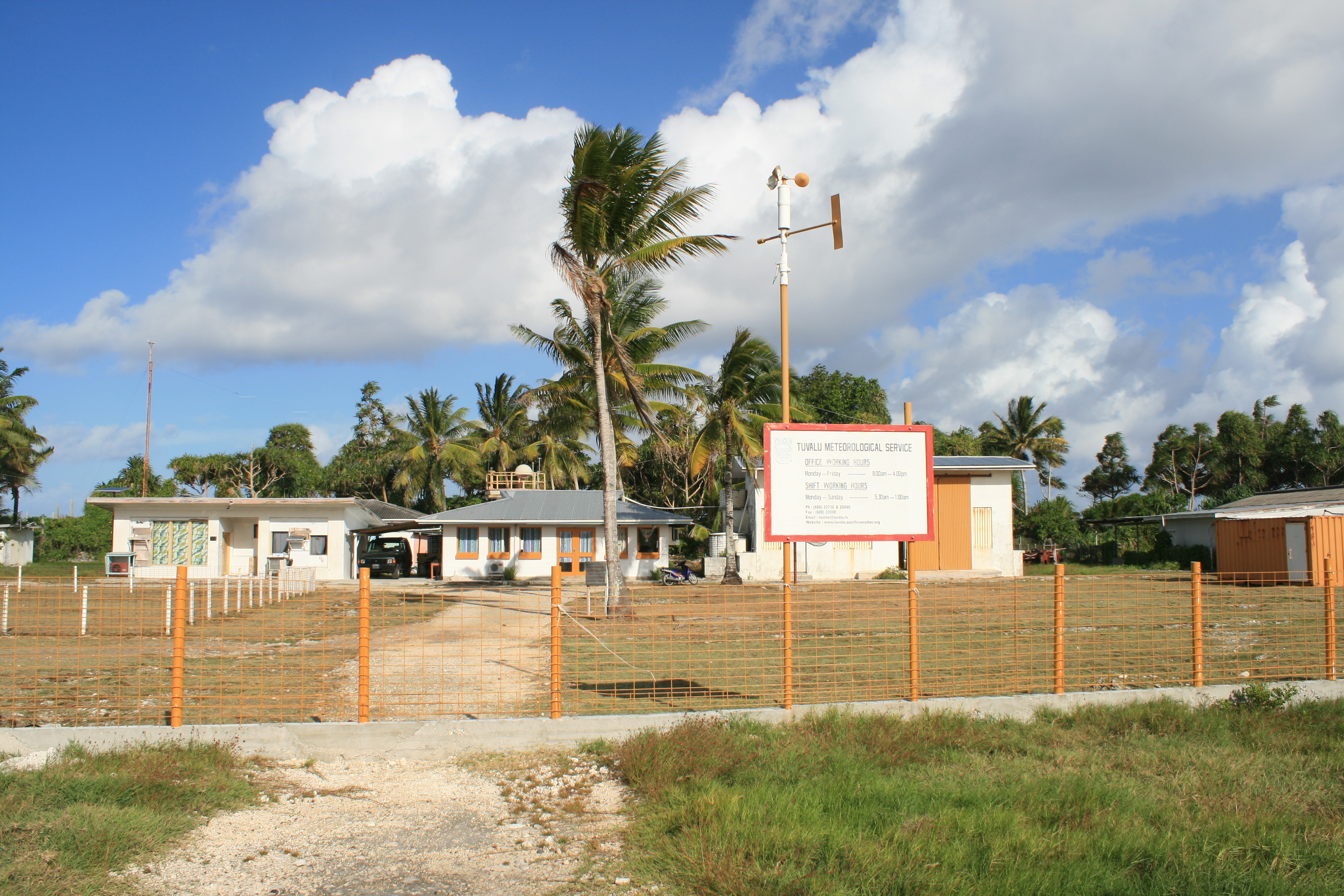
- Tuvalu Meteorology Service, Fongafale, Funafuti atoll

Agency overview
- Formed: 1951
- Jurisdiction: Government of Tuvalu
- Headquarters: Fongafale, Funafuti, Tuvalu; 8.32°S 179.13°E
- Employees: 14 meteorological officers and observers; 4 technical staff
- Minister responsible: Monise Laafai
- Agency executive: Nikotemo Iona, Director (2019)
- Parent agency: Ministry of Works Communications and Transport
- Website: Tuvalu Meteorological Service website

Map

Footnotes
- WMO Stn. No. 91643 GSN, RBSN, GUAN

The Tuvalu Meteorological Service (TMS) is the principal meteorological observatory of Tuvalu and is responsible for providing weather services to the islands of Tuvalu. A meteorological office was established on Funafuti at the time the islands of Tuvalu were administered as parts of the Gilbert and Ellice Islands colony of the United Kingdom. The meteorological office is now an agency of the government of Tuvalu.

The main observational office is on Funafuti. TMS operates outstations on Nanumea, Nui and Niulakita. TMS operates or monitors: 4 synoptic stations; 5 rainfall stations; 1 upper air research program; 1 tide gauge with Tsunami warning system; 1 Continuous Global Positioning System (CGPS) station; 1 seismic station.

The TMS publishes weather forecasts, warnings as to tropical cyclones, weather charts and weather satellite images on its website, with weather forecasts and storm warnings also broadcast by the Tuvalu Media Corporation, which operates Radio Tuvalu.

== History ==
The meteorological office on Funafuti was established in 1951 under the auspices of the South Pacific Air Transport Council (SPATC). An upper air observation programme was established in 1960. After the dissolution of SPATC in 1979, the Meteorological Service of New Zealand Limited supported the upper air programme until the TMS assumed responsibility for the programme, with continuing support by the New Zealand Ministry of Foreign Affairs and Trade (MFAT)/NZAID. The TMS works with the New Zealand MetService, the Fiji Meteorological Service, the Australian Bureau of Meteorology, Geoscience Australia, the United States Geological Survey and the National Weather Service.

Ms Hilai Vavae retired as Director of the Tuvalu Met Service in 2014.

== Climatology of Tuvalu ==
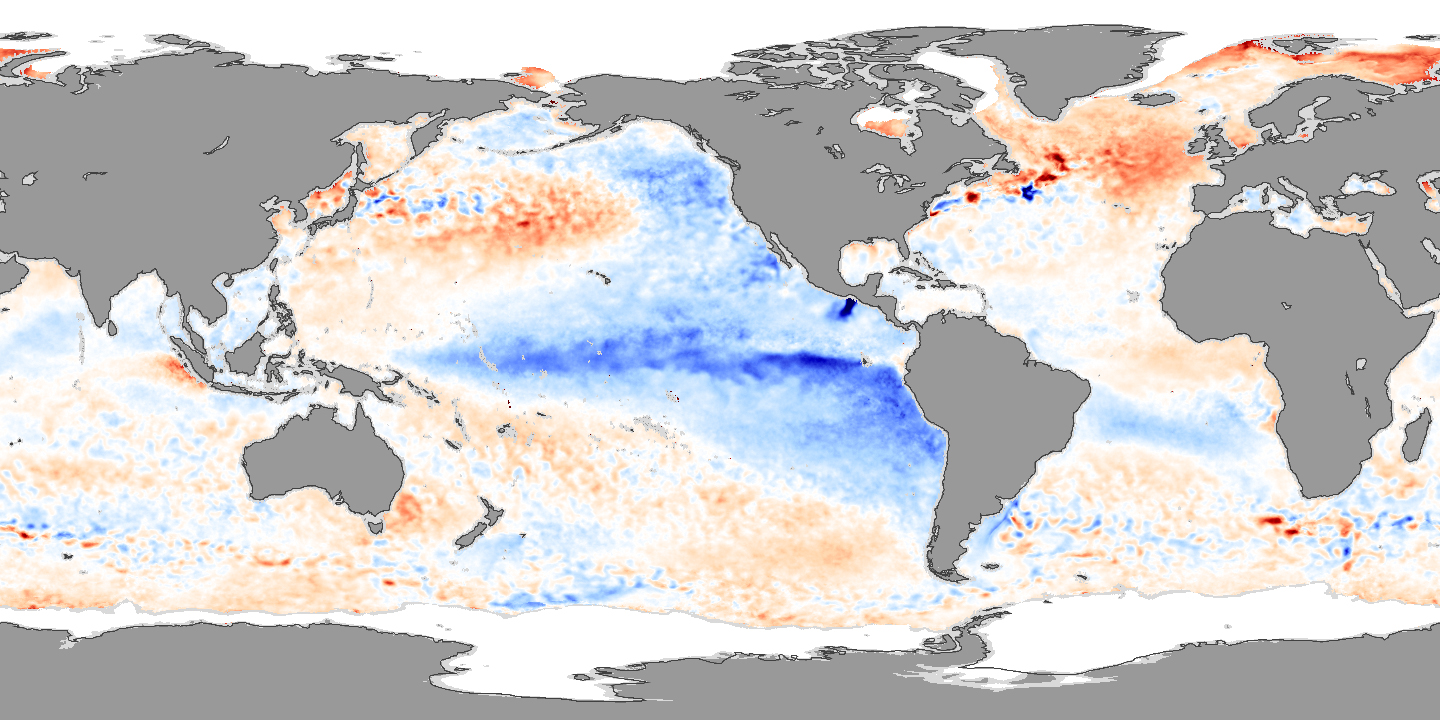
Sea surface temperature anomalies in November 2007 showing La Niña conditions. Blue=temperature below average; red=temperature above average

Tuvalu participates in the operations of the Secretariat of the Pacific Regional Environment Programme (SPREP). The climate of the Pacific region at the equator is influenced by a number of factors; the science of which is the subject of continuing research. The SPREP described the climate of Tuvalu as being:

[I]nfluenced by a number of factors such as trade wind regimes, the paired Hadley cells and Walker circulation, seasonally varying convergence zones such as the South Pacific Convergence Zone (SPCZ), semi-permanent subtropical high-pressure belts, and zonal westerlies to the south, with the El Niño–Southern Oscillation (ENSO) as the dominant mode of year to year variability (…). The Madden–Julian oscillation (MJO) also is a major mode of variability of the tropical atmosphere-ocean system of the Pacific on times scales of 30 to 70 days (…), while the leading mode with decadal time-scale is the Interdecadal Pacific Oscillation (IPO) (…). A number of studies suggest the influence of global warming could be a major factor in accentuating the current climate regimes and the changes from normal that come with ENSO events (…).

The sea level in Tuvalu varies as a consequence of a wide range of atmospheric and oceanographic influences. The 2011 report of the Pacific Climate Change Science Program published by the Australian Government, describes a strong zonal (east‑to-west) sea-level slope along the equator, with sea level west of the International Date Line (180° longitude) being about a half metre higher than found in the eastern equatorial Pacific and South American coastal regions. The trade winds that push surface water westward create this zonal tilting of sea level on the equator. Below the equator a higher sea level can also be found about 20° to 40° south (Tuvalu is spread out from 6° to 10° south). The Pacific Climate Change Science Program Report (2011) describes the year-by-year volatility in the sea-level as resulting from the El Niño–Southern Oscillation (ENSO):

ENSO has a major influence on sea levels across the Pacific and this can influence the occurrence of extreme sea levels. During La Niña events, strengthened trade winds cause higher than normal sea levels in the western tropical Pacific, and lower than normal levels in the east. Conversely, during El Niño events, weakened trade winds are unable to maintain the normal gradient of sea level across the tropical Pacific, leading to a drop in sea level in the west and a rise in the east. Pacific islands within about 10° of the equator are most strongly affected by ENSO‑related sea-level variations."

The Pacific (inter-)decadal oscillation is a climate switch phenomenon that results in changes from periods of La Niña to periods of El Niño. This has an effect on sea levels. For example, in 2000 there was a switch from periods of downward pressure of El Niño on sea levels to an upward pressure of La Niña on sea levels, which upward pressure causes more frequent and higher high tide levels. The Perigean spring tide (often called a king tide) can result in seawater flooding low-lying areas of the islands of Tuvalu.

== Role of the Tuvalu Meteorological Service ==
The purpose of the meteorological programmes operated by the TMS is to gather data in the tropical western Pacific so as to work to achieve “accurate production of weather forecasts, seasonal and interannual climate forecasting (ENSO predictions), and understanding changes in climate and sea level for Tuvalu and its neighbouring Pacific Islands. Tuvalu lies across a known development region for tropical cyclones and ENSO activity. It provides crucial data to global weather, climate modelling and forecasting centres. It also provides the key data used for tropical cyclone and ENSO forecasting.”

=== Meteorological programmes ===
The TMS operates 2 meteorological programmes (surface observation programme and upper air programme) and hosts other climatological research projects.

=== Surface observations ===
The TMS carries out ground level observations of various weather elements. This data is shared with collaborating partners in the World Meteorological Organization - World Weather Watch (WWW), the Global Climate Observing System (GCOS) and the Global Earth Observation System of Systems (GEOSS).

=== Upper air observations ===
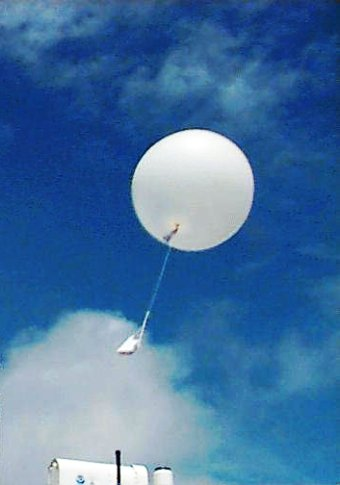
A radiosonde shortly after launch.

The upper air observation programme in Funafuti makes radiosonde observations to collect upper air weather for weather forecasting and research. The radiosonde observations use a small, expendable instrument package is suspended below a 2 metres (6.6 ft) wide balloon filled with hydrogen or helium. As the radiosonde rises at about 300 meters/minute (1,000 ft/min), sensors on the radiosonde measure profiles of pressure, temperature, and relative humidity. These sensors are linked to a battery-powered radio transmitter that sends the sensor measurements to a ground receiver. By tracking the position of the radiosonde in flight, information on wind speed and direction are also obtained.

The data is shared with Regional Specialized Meteorological Centers (RSMCs) in Nadi, Wellington, Brisbane, Melbourne and Honolulu. The weather modelling carried out by the RSMCs enables more accurate forecasts to be prepared for Tuvalu and for the tropical western Pacific.

=== Tropical cyclone prediction ===
The meteorological observations of the TMS are shared with other regional agencies that attempt to predict how many tropical cyclones and severe tropical cyclones will develop within the Southern Pacific. New Zealand's National Institute of Water & Atmospheric Research (NIWA) and collaborating agencies including the Meteorological Service of New Zealand and Pacific Island National Meteorological Services (including the TMS) issue the "Island Climate Update Tropical Cyclone Outlook" for the Pacific. This forecast attempts to predict how many tropical cyclones and severe tropical cyclones will develop within the Southern Pacific between 135°E and 120°W as well as how many will affect a particular island nation. The Fiji Meteorological Service, while collaborating with NIWA and partners, also publishes its own seasonal forecast for the South Pacific basin between 160°E and 120°W. The data collected by the regional meteorological agencies is provided to the World Meteorological Organisation, which publishes current tropical cyclone information for the South-West Pacific Ocean.

=== Other climatological research programmes and projects ===
The TMS also hosts other scientific and research programmes, which involves the TMS monitoring:

- The tide gauge, which was installed in 1978 by the University of Hawaii.
- The SEAFRAME tide gauge, which is modern Aquatrak acoustic gauge installed in 1993 by the Australian National Tidal Facility (NTF) as part of the AusAID-sponsored South Pacific Sea Level and Climate Monitoring Project.

TMS participates in research projects including:

- South Pacific Sea Level and Climate Monitoring Project (SPSLCMP): which was developed in 1991 as an Australian Government response to “concerns raised by member countries of the South Pacific Forum over the potential impacts of human-induced global warming on climate and sea levels in the Pacific”. This project is conducted in conjunction with Geoscience Australia (GA), which installed a Continuous Global Positioning System (CGPS) station at the TMS office.
- Climate and Ocean Monitoring and Prediction (COMP) project: established by Australian Bureau of Meteorology as part of the Pacific Islands Climate Prediction Project (PI-CPP).
- Seasonal Climate Outlooks in Pacific Island Countries (SCOPIC) project: established by Australian Bureau of Meteorology, which is a “decision support system for generating probabilistic predictions (seasonal climate outlooks) for rainfall, temperature or other climate related parameters”.

== Membership of meteorological and geoscience organizations ==
TMS participates in the activities of:

- The World Meteorological Organization (WMO).
- The South Pacific Applied Geoscience Commission (SOPAC).
- The Secretariat of the Pacific Regional Environment Programme (SPREP).
- SOPAC / SPREP / WMO sponsored meetings of Regional Meteorological Service Directors and Regional Disaster Managers.
- The Pacific Meteorological Council (PMC): is a specialized subsidiary body of SPREP, established in July 2011 at the 14th Regional Meteorological Services Directors meeting in Majuro, Marshall Islands on a bi-annual basis to facilitate and coordinate the scientific and technical programme and activities of the Regional Meteorological Services.
- The Online Climate Outlook Forum (OCOF): also known as the Pacific Islands online Climate Outlook Forum (PICOF) that is a monthly discussion among Pacific Island National Meteorological Services (NMS) and the Australian Bureau of Meteorology. The OCOF assists in the implementation of the SCOPIC project and the Climate Adaptation Projects that are supported by the Australian Bureau of Meteorology.

== See also ==
- Geography of Tuvalu
- Climate change in Tuvalu
- 2011 Tuvalu drought
