= Moira Simmons-Avafoa =

Activist

Moira Simmons-Avafoa (born c. 1990) is a climate-change activist and civil servant from Tuvalu.

== Career ==
Simmons-Avafoa is outspoken about the effects of global warming - particularly on the lives of women and children, who also have the least input into decision-making. She was a Senior Advisor - Pacific Division with the Ministry of Foreign Affairs in Tuvalu until a secondment to the Pacific Islands Forum Secretariat as part of the Smaller Island States Attachment Programme. In 2019, she had returned to her Senior Adviser role.

In 2018, she was the programme's representative at the Green Climate Fund's Structured Dialogue with the Pacific conference. In 2017, she was one of 22 women selected to take part in an international climate-change negotiation training workshop. The workshop was entitled Pacific Women's Climate Change Negotiating Conference and was facilitated by the Pacific Islands Forum and the Australian Government.
