= Premna tahitensis =

Conservation status
- Least Concern (IUCN 2.3)

Scientific classification
- Kingdom: Plantae
- Clade: Tracheophytes
- Clade: Angiosperms
- Clade: Eudicots
- Clade: Asterids
- Order: Lamiales
- Family: Lamiaceae
- Genus: Premna
- Species: P. tahitensis

Binomial name
- Premna tahitensis Schauer

Species of plant

Premna tahitensis is a species of plant in the family Lamiaceae. It is native to the Bismarck Archipelago in Papuasia and some islands of the south Pacific: Fiji, the Marquesas Islands, Niue, the Pitcairn Islands, Samoa, the Society Islands, Tonga, the Tuamotu Islands, the Tubuai Islands, and Wallis and Futuna.
