= Cyclone Bebe =

Category 3 South Pacific cyclone in 1972

Severe Tropical Cyclone Bebe
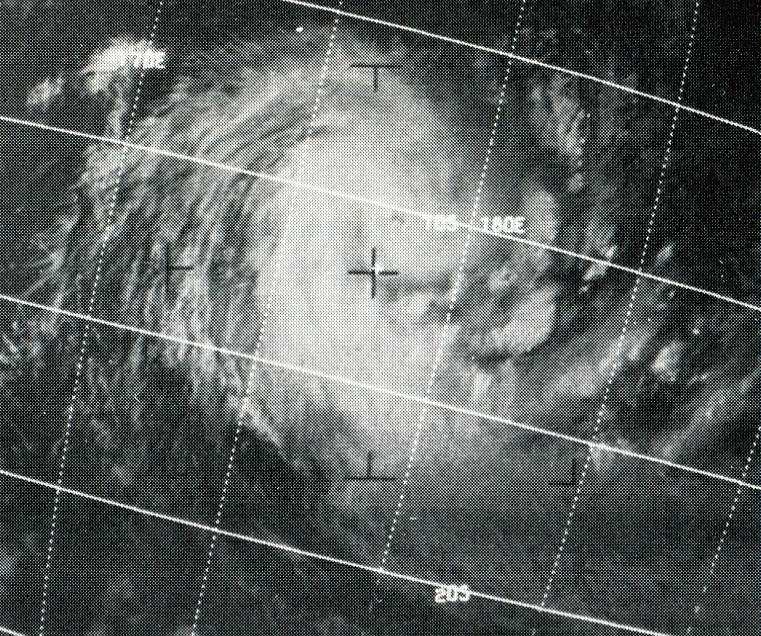
- Satellite image of Cyclone Bebe

Meteorological history
- Formed: October 19, 1972
- Dissipated: October 28, 1972

Category 3 severe tropical cyclone
- 10-minute sustained (FMS)
- Highest winds: 150 km/h (90 mph)
- Lowest pressure: 945 hPa (mbar); 27.91 inHg

Overall effects
- Fatalities: 25
- Damage: $20 million (1972 USD)
- Areas affected: Gilbert and Ellice Islands, Fiji
- IBTrACS
- Part of the 1972–73 South Pacific cyclone season

Severe Tropical Cyclone Bebe, also known as Hurricane Bebe, was a pre-season storm during October 1972 in the South Pacific Ocean that severely affected Fiji, the Ellice Islands (now Tuvalu), and the Gilbert Islands (now Kiribati).

== Meteorological history ==
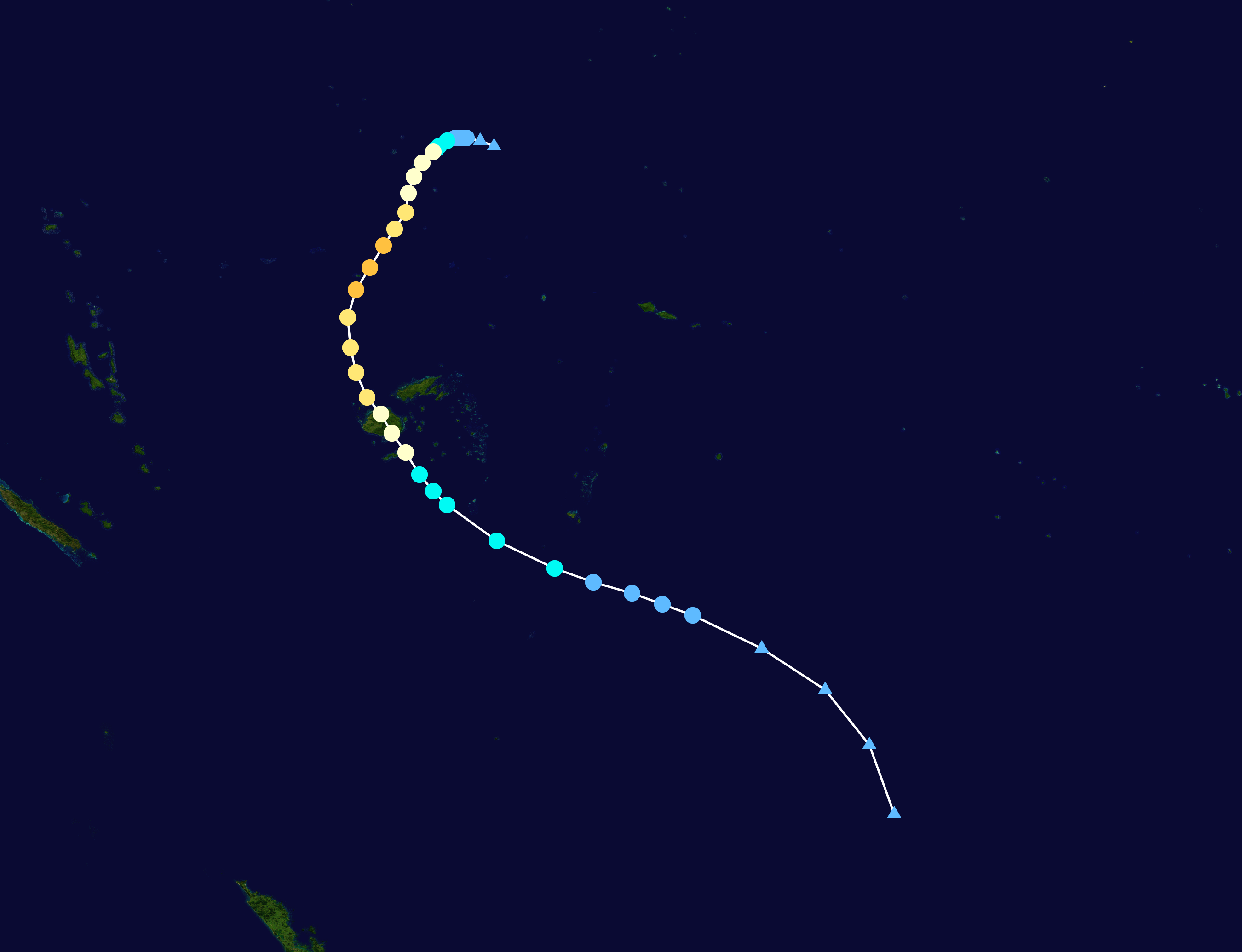
Map plotting the storm's track and intensity, according to the Saffir–Simpson scale Map key Saffir–Simpson scale Tropical depression (≤38 mph, ≤62 km/h) Tropical storm (39–73 mph, 63–118 km/h) Category 1 (74–95 mph, 119–153 km/h) Category 2 (96–110 mph, 154–177 km/h) Category 3 (111–129 mph, 178–208 km/h) Category 4 (130–156 mph, 209–251 km/h) Category 5 (≥157 mph, ≥252 km/h) Unknown Storm type Tropical cyclone Subtropical cyclone Extratropical cyclone, remnant low, tropical disturbance, or monsoon depression

The origins of Severe Tropical Cyclone Bebe can be traced to a pair of tropical disturbances, which were first noted on either side of the Equator near the 175th meridian west during October 16. The first system developed in the Northern Hemisphere and eventually intensified into Typhoon Olga, before it impacted the Marshall Islands. The second disturbance developed within the South Pacific Ocean and moved westwards, before it started to show signs of developing into a tropical cyclone during October 19. Over the next couple of days, the system started to move south-westwards and was named Bebe by the New Zealand Meteorological Service, after it had become a Category 1 tropical cyclone on the modern-day Australian scale. During October 21, the system passed near or over the Ellice Island of Funafuti, where hurricane-force winds were recorded.

During October 22, Bebe weakened slightly, as it passed about 120 km (75 mi) to the west of the Tuvaluan reef island Niulakita. By this time the system's circulation extended out about 965 km (600 mi) and had started to move south-eastwards. Bebe was subsequently located about 60 km (35 mi) to the northeast of Rotuma, by a Royal New Zealand Air Force aircraft that was on a search-and-rescue mission to Tuvalu. The system subsequently passed near or over Rotuma and peaked with 10-minute sustained winds estimated at 155 km/h (100 mph) and 1-minute sustained wind speeds of 205 km/h (125 mph), which made it equivalent to a category 3 tropical cyclone on both the Australian Scale and the Saffir-Simpson hurricane wind scale. After affecting Rotuma with hurricane-force winds, the system moved southwards towards the main islands of Fiji, and appeared on the Cossor radar screen at the Nadi Meteorological Office during October 23.

The centre of the hurricane moved on to the north coast of Viti Levu. During October 25, Bebe transitioned into an extra-tropical cyclone, before its remnants were last noted on October 28.

== Effects ==
Bebe adversely affected both Tuvalu and the Fijian islands, where it left 25 people dead (six in Tuvalu and nineteen in Fiji) and thousands homeless. Overall damages were estimated at over $20 million (1972 USD).

=== Gilbert and Ellice Islands ===
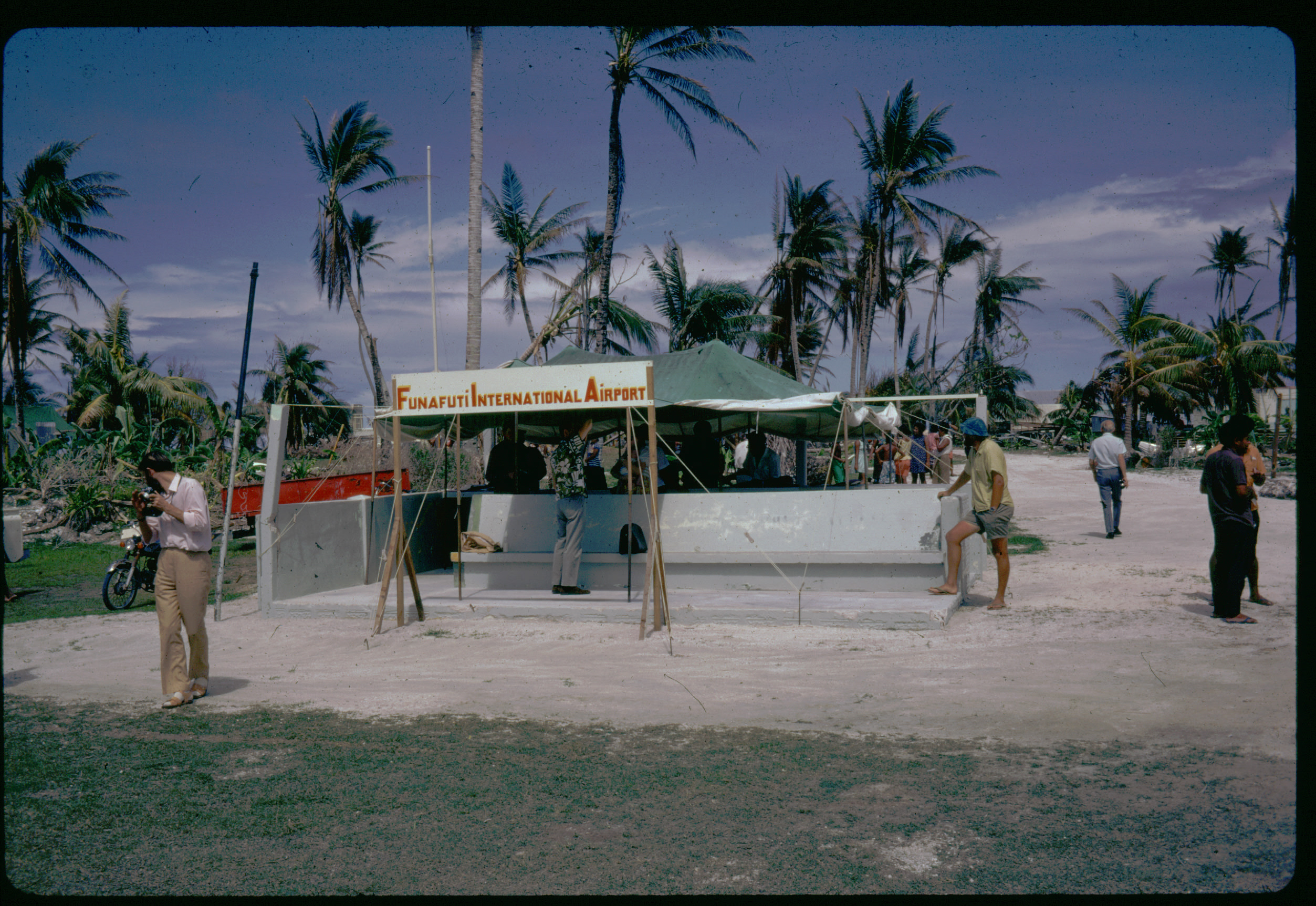
Funafuti International Airport in November 1972, showing damage from Cyclone Bebe.

Modern-day Tuvalu (at the time a British colony known as the Ellice Islands) was the first island nation to be affected by Bebe, between October 19 and 22. The system started to affect Tuvalu during October 19, with intermittent heavy rain reported in the island nation, before the weather deteriorated further during the next day, with reported strong winds increasing to gale force, flooding and a rough sea. During October 20, as the seas were rough, the ship Moana Raoi (which had just arrived in Funafuti's lagoon, carrying supplies from Suva, Fiji) was anchored peacefully. During the next day, as the Funafuti International Airport airstrip was flooded, the fortnightly Air Pacific aircraft that was carrying supplies from Nadi, Fiji, turned back while it was located about 80 km (50 mi) from the airstrip. After a hurricane warning was received at the New Zealand Meteorological Service weather station, its chief tried to warn as many people as possible, including the Master of the Moana Raoi, the fishery officer of the Van Camp fishing fleet, and the agent of the Gilbert and Ellice Islands development authority.

Little to no significant damage was recorded on the majority of the islands; however, the low-lying island of Funafuti was significantly affected after the system passed over the coral atoll during October 21. Hurricane-force winds were observed on the island for several hours, while a storm surge swept over the island, killing three people, destroying houses, and leaving coral debris.

High seas associated with the system breached a coral wall at the meteorological station, which as a result caused water to sweep through the various buildings and destroy most of the equipment.

=== Fiji ===
Bebe affected the whole of the newly independent island nation of Fiji between October 22–25, where it became the worst tropical cyclone since 1952 to affect the islands. Ahead of the system threatening the Fijian Islands, the Nadi weather office issued hurricane warnings for most of the island nation including Rotuma. As a result, hurricane shutters were put up on various buildings, schools were closed, local air service and cruise ships were cancelled while other smaller ships took shelter. The Nadi and Nausori international airports were also closed. On October 22, the Fijian Parliament was adjourned in order to prepare for the hurricane. This is wrong.

During October 23, the system passed over the Fijian Dependency of Rotuma, with hurricane-force wind speeds of around 275 km/h (170 mph) had been recorded on the island. As a result, widespread damage was reported on the island, with various houses and other buildings either destroyed or extensively damaged. The island also lost the majority of its crops, with coconut palms, copra and citrus trees damaged or destroyed. As a result, it was estimated that between 60%-90% of the population would be dependent on relief supplies for the next three to six months.

== See also ==
- Cyclone Tomas
- List of off-season South Pacific tropical cyclones
- Tuvalu Meteorological Service
