= Pepetua Latasi =

Tuvaluan civil servant

Pepetua Election Latasi is a Tuvaluan civil servant. She is the Director for Climate Change and Disaster Coordinator under the Office of the Prime Minister of Tuvalu. Her position involves working with the climate change policy of Tuvalu and serving as the country's representative in climate change negotiation abroad.

Latasi began her career in Tuvalu's Department of Environment, where she worked for ten years before becoming Director of Department of Climate Change and Disaster. After temporarily taking a break from this work, she obtained an undergraduate degree in climate change policy and environment management in 2008. She later chaired the United Nations Least Developed Countries Expert Group, a twelve-member committee established by the United Nations Framework Convention on Climate Change, and co-chaired the Executive Committee on the Warsaw International Mechanism for Loss and Damage with Shereen D'Souza of the United States. At the 2015 United Nations Climate Change Conference, she served as the Chief Negotiator for Tuvalu.
