= Perigean spring tide =

Type of spring tide

A perigean spring tide is a tide that occurs three or four times per year when a perigee (the point nearest Earth reached by the Moon during its 27.3-day elliptic orbit) coincides with a spring tide (when the Sun, the Moon, and Earth are nearly aligned every two weeks). This has a slight but measurable impact on the spring tide, usually adding no more than a couple of inches.

== Astronomical causes ==
The Moon's orbit around Earth is elliptical, which causes the Moon to be closer to Earth and farther away at different times. The Moon and the Sun are aligned every two weeks, which results in spring tides, which are 20% higher than normal. During the period of the new moon, the Moon and Sun are on the same side of Earth, so the high tides or bulges produced independently by each reinforce each other (and has nothing to do with the spring season). Tides of maximum height and depression produced during this period are known as spring tide. Spring tides that coincide with the moon's closest approach to Earth ("perigee") have been called perigean spring tides and generally increase the normal tidal range by a couple of inches.

The Ash Wednesday Storm of 1962 coincided with a perigean spring tide. It inundated the entire Atlantic coastline of the United States, from the Carolinas to Cape Cod, resulting in a loss of 40 lives and over US$500 million of property damage.

== See also ==
- King tide
