= King tide =

Especially high spring tide

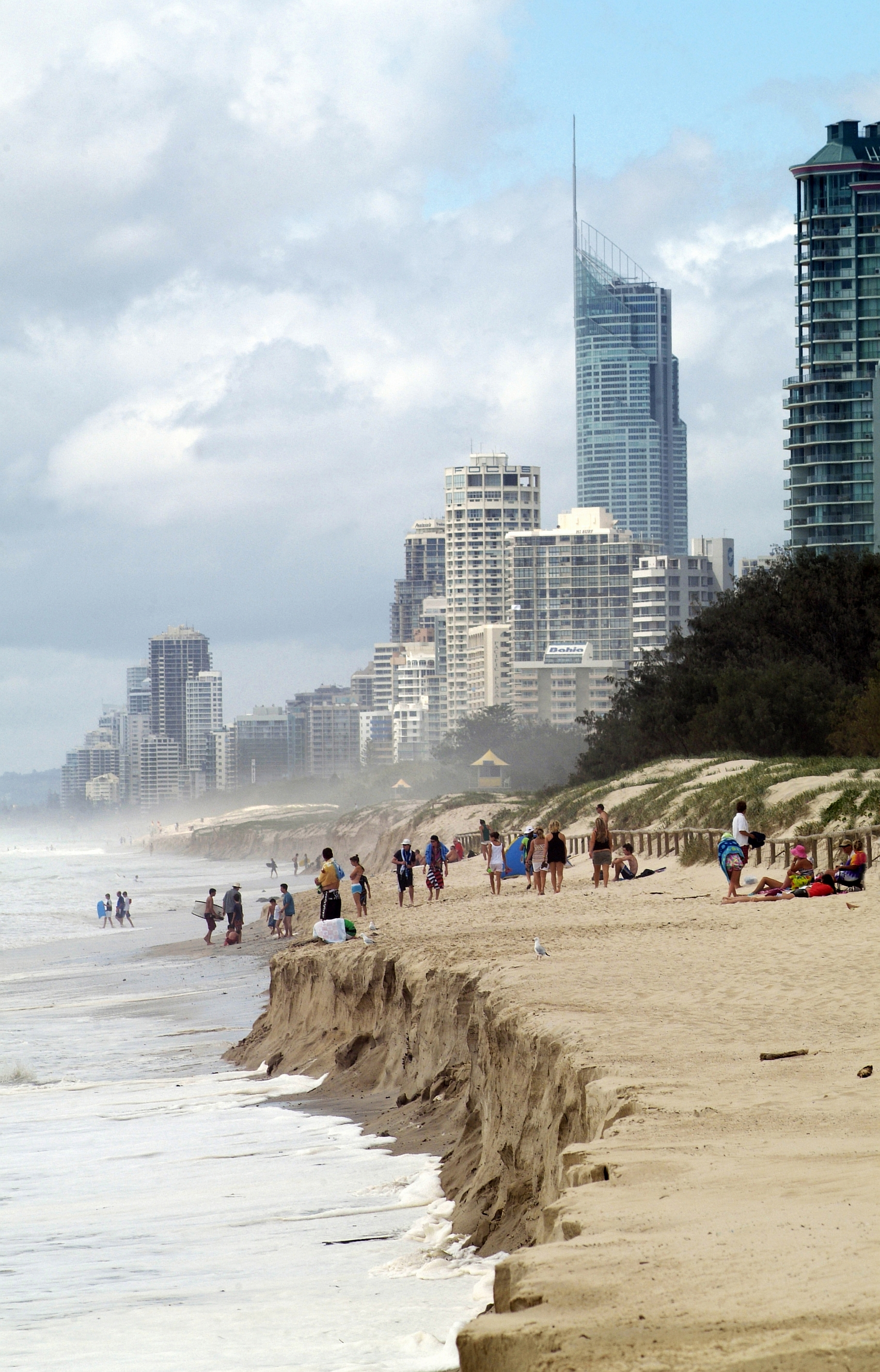
The erosive effects of a king tide on the Gold Coast, Queensland in 2009

A king tide is an exceptionally high spring tide, generally referring to perigean spring tides occurring around the time of perihelion. While "king tide" is not a scientific term nor typically used in a scientific context, whenever it is referenced in such contexts it is frequently clarified that it refers specifically to such perihelial perigean spring tides.

The expression originated in Australia in 2009, to describe especially high tides that occur a few times per year. It is now used in North America as well, particularly in low-lying South Florida, where king tides can cause tidal flooding. In Vancouver, Canada, king tides are a growing problem along its seawall.

== Definition ==
King tides are the highest tides. They are naturally occurring, predictable events.

Tides are the movement of water across Earth's surface caused by the combined effects of the gravitational forces exerted by the Moon, Sun, and the rotation of Earth which manifest in the local rise and fall of sea levels. Tides are driven by the relative positions of the Earth, Sun, Moon, land formations, and relative location on Earth. In the lunar month, the highest tides occur roughly every 14 days, at the new and full moons, when the gravitational pull of the Moon and the Sun are in alignment. These highest tides in the lunar cycle are called spring tides.

The proximity of the Moon in relation to Earth and Earth in relation to the Sun also has an effect on tidal ranges. The Moon moves around Earth in an elliptic orbit that takes about 29 days to complete. The gravitational force is greatest when the Moon is at perigee (closest to Earth) and smallest when it is at apogee (farthest from Earth). The Moon has a larger effect on the tides than the Sun, but the Sun's position also has an influence on the tides. Earth moves around the Sun in an elliptic orbit that takes a little over 365 days to complete. Its gravitational force is greatest when the Earth is at perihelion – closest to the Sun in early January – and least when the Earth is at aphelion – farthest from the Sun in early July.

The king tides occur at new and full moon when the Earth, Moon and Sun are aligned at perigee and perihelion, resulting in the largest tidal range seen over the course of a year. So, tides are enhanced when the Earth is closest to the Sun around 2 January of each year. They are reduced when it is furthest from the Sun, around 2 July.

The predicted heights of a king tide can be further augmented by local weather patterns and ocean conditions.
