= Telephone numbers in Tuvalu =

- Country: Tuvalu
- Continent: Oceania
- Country code: +688
- International access: 00

Country Code: +688
International Call Prefix: 00

== Landlines ==
The local telephone numbers in Tuvalu are five digits long with no leading trunk zero to be omitted by international callers. The first two digits relate to the Tuvalu island in which is being called. The remaining three digits are for the local number; however, when calling within the same island, all five digits must be dialled.

=== Atoll codes ===
Each of the nine atolls (districts) of Tuvalu has a dialing code, apart from Funafuti which has two.

- 20 Funafuti
- 21 Funafuti
- 22 Niulakita
- 23 Nui (atoll)
- 24 Nukufetau
- 25 Nukulaelae
- 26 Nanumea
- 27 Nanumaga
- 28 Niutao
- 29 Vaitupu

=== Mobile telephones ===
90: Mobile (prepaid) WNP:

The mobile network was destroyed in a storm in 2007, and rebuilt in 2009.

=== Other numbers ===
The telephone operator can be contacted on 20006 and the emergency services can be contacted on 911. Tuvalu has generated a lot of revenue from running adult entertainment lines via their country's dialing code (usually beginning with 62), however due to political and religious reasons they have decided to put a stop to this.

== See also ==
- Telecommunications in Tuvalu
