= Economy of Tuvalu =

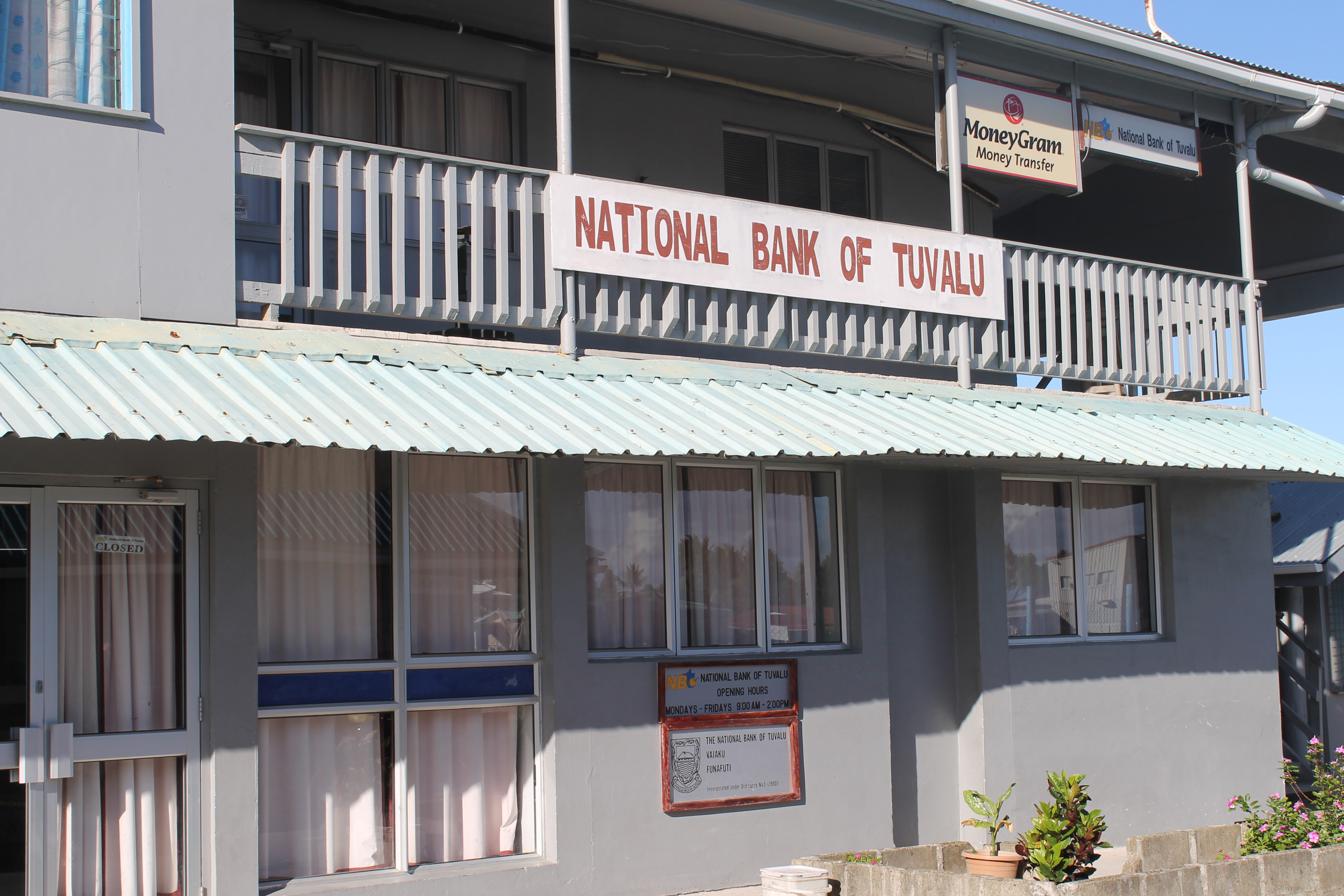
- National Bank of Tuvalu in Funafuti
- Currency: Tuvaluan dollar and Australian dollar
- Fixed exchange rates: T$1 = A$1 = 100 cents

Statistics
- GDP: $0.065 billion (nominal, 2025f); ▲$0.069 billion (PPP, 2025f)
- GDP rank: 194th (nominal, 2025); 196th (PPP, 2025)
- GDP growth: ▲7.9% (2023); ▲3.3% (2024f); ▲2.8% (2025f); ▲2.3% (2026f)
- GDP per capita: ▼$6,543 (nominal, 2025f); ▲$7,006 (PPP, 2025f)
- GDP per capita rank: 105th (nominal, 2025); 140th (PPP, 2025)
- Inflation (CPI): 1.5% (2025f)
- All values, unless otherwise stated, are in US dollars.

Location of Tuvalu

Tuvalu is a Polynesian island nation located in the Pacific Ocean, midway between Hawaii and Australia, with a total population, recorded in the census of 12 December 2022, of 10,643. The economy of Tuvalu is constrained by its remoteness and lack of economies of scale. Government revenues largely come from fishing licences (primarily paid under the South Pacific Tuna Treaty); direct grants from international donors (government donors as well as from the Asian Development Bank); and income from the Tuvalu Trust Fund. The lease of its highly fortuitous .tv Top Level Domain (TLD) also contributes revenue. The sale of stamps since the independence of Tuvalu in 1976 has been an important source of revenue for the country and government. However, such revenue has significantly declined in recent years. Tuvalu has hardly any tourism. It has no tour guides, tour operators, or organised activities, and no cruise ships visit.

== History ==
The Tuvalu Trust Fund was established in 1987 by the United Kingdom, Australia and New Zealand to help supplement national deficits, underpin economic development, and help the nation achieve greater financial autonomy. The Fund has contributed roughly A$79 million, 15% of the annual government budget each year since 1990. With a capital value of about 2.5 times GDP, the Trust Fund provides an important cushion for Tuvalu's volatile income sources from fishing and royalties from the sale of the .tv domain.

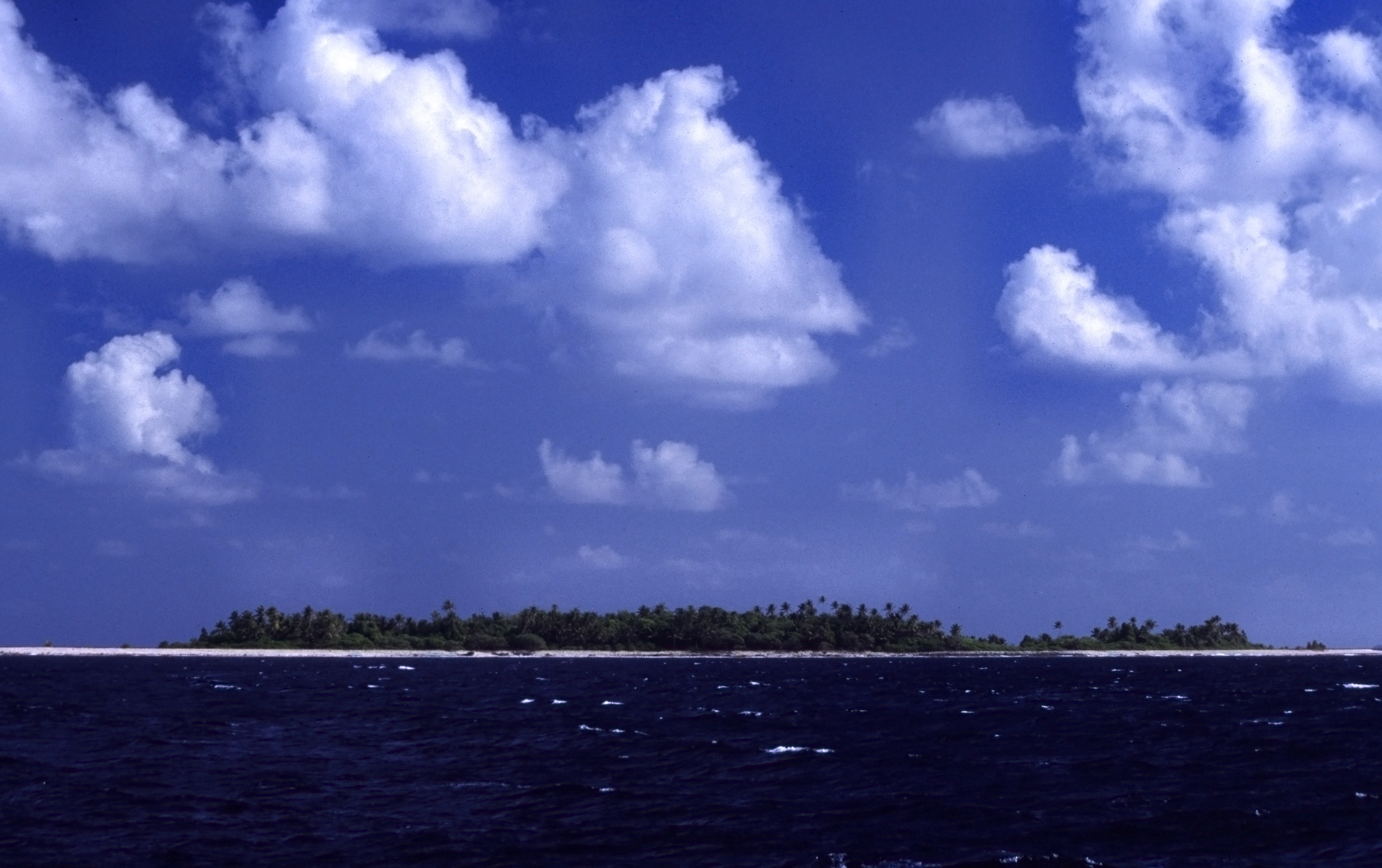
Funafuti

From 1996 to 2002, Tuvalu was one of the best performing Pacific Island economies and achieved an average real gross domestic product (GDP) growth rate of 5.6% per annum. Since 2002 economic growth has slowed as Tuvalu was exposed to rapid rises in world prices of fuel and food with the level of inflation peaking at 10% in 2008, and falling to 0% in November 2010.

However, due to the acute level of geographic, macroeconomic and financial isolation, scale of area, population infrastructure and agriculture, climate change, oil dependency, contracting GDP and economic dependency many sources in this decade view Tuvalu as an extremely vulnerable economy. The country is also dependent on imported fuel, with gas prices quoted at $12/gal in 2009. The high cost of petroleum products has encouraged the development of projects to access renewable energy in Tuvalu.

Although listed by the UN as a Lower Middle Income LDC, it scores very high in terms of Economic Vulnerability Index, with a rating of 79.7 out of 100 in 2009, leading the UN to state that Tuvalu is the most "economically vulnerable country in the world". Due to the factors addressed earlier, Tuvalu yields limited revenue from exports.

Tuvalu joined the International Monetary Fund (IMF) on 24 June 2010. World Bank Statistics outline that in 2010 Tuvalu produced a bottom-tier ranking Gross Domestic Product of $31,350,804 and Gross National Income of $4,760, compared to other Pacific SIDS states such as Kiribati at $2,010 and the Marshall Islands at $3,640.

The growth of GDP of Tuvalu was at a high point in 2019. The global pandemic resulted in a retraction in the level of GDP (-3.7% in 2020, -0.5% in 2021, and -2.3% in 2022). Tuvalu experienced a 7.9% GDP growth in 2023, however the growth was estimated to moderate to 3.3 percent in 2024. An important factor in the moderation in growth is an expected decline in fishing revenue. In 2025, GDP growth was estimated to further moderate to 3 percent of GDP. In 2026, the International Monetary Fund (IMF) projects GDP growth to ease further to 2.1 percent. This trend towards more modest and sustainable growth levels reflects underlying structural challenges in the economy of Tuvalu, including sluggish productivity, rising emigration, and growing exposure to climate-related risks, and also Tuvalu’s exposure to global economic conditions. Tuvalu’s economy is small and heavily reliant on a few sectors, including fishing, government services, and remittances from Tuvaluans participated in regional employment programmes in Australia and New Zealand. The National Bank of Tuvalu calculated remittances from New Zealand and Australia rose to 7% of GDP between 2021 and 2023.

The increase in inflation in 2022 was due to the rapid rise in the cost of food resulting from a drought that affected food production and from rising global food prices, following Russia’s invasion of Ukraine (food imports represent 19 percent of Tuvalu’s GDP, while agriculture makes up for only 10 percent of GDP). The government declared a national state of emergency in November 2022 as a consequence of a drought that exhausted rainwater supplies. The government responded to the rising inflation through untargeted “inflation mitigation payouts” (totalling AUD 400,000 or AUD 40 dollars per eligible household) and by expanding a list of products under price controls. In 2023, the IMF Article IV consultation with Tuvalu concluded that a successful vaccination strategy allowed Tuvalu to lift coronavirus disease (COVID-19) containment measures at the end of 2022. However, the economic cost of the pandemic was significant, with real gross domestic product growth falling from 13.8% in 2019 to -4.3 percent in 2020, although it recovered to 1.8% in 2021. Inflation rose to 11.5% in 2022, but inflation is projected to fall to 2.8% by 2028.

=== Economic Assessment ===
The Asian Development Bank described the Global Economic Crisis (GEC) as impacting on Tuvalu through: “(i) lower demand for Tuvalu seafarers and, therefore, falling remittances; (ii) volatile exchange rate movements affecting the value of remittances, revenues from fishing licence fees, and food prices; and (iii) lower market value of the Tuvalu Trust Fund (TTF), which at the end of May 2010 was about 12% below the maintained value. Thus, as a direct result of the GEC, no distribution was made from the fund to the budget for 2010 and further distributions are unlikely while there is uncertainty in international financial markets.”

The IMF 2010 Country Report describes economic activity in Tuvalu as dampened by lower offshore earnings, with “[t]he economy is expected to have almost no growth in 2010, and growth is projected to be zero or even turn negative in 2011, led by lower government spending, and remain low over the medium term.”

The IMF 2014 Country Report noted that real GDP growth had been volatile averaging only 1 percent in the past decade. The 2014 Country Report describes economic growth prospects as generally positive as the result of large revenues from fishing licenses, together with substantial foreign aid, "while, over the medium to long run, growth prospects may be hampered by the dominance of inefficient public enterprise in the economy, uncertainty in the fisheries sector, and weak competitiveness."

The IMF 2021 Country Report concluded that swift implementation of COVID-19 containment measures and COVID-related fiscal spending financed by buoyant fishing revenues and donor grants have allowed Tuvalu to avoid a recession in 2020.

== Geography of Tuvalu ==
Islands of Tuvalu

Agriculture in Tuvalu is focused on coconut trees and growing pulaka in large pits of composted soil below the water table. Subsistence farming of coconut palms to produce copra and fishing remain the primary economic activities, particularly off the capital island of Funafuti. There is no apparent large income disparity among the residents, although virtually the only jobs in the islands that pay a steady wage or salary are with the government, which make up about two-thirds of those in formal employment. About 15% of adult males work as seamen on foreign-flagged merchant ships. Population growth on the outer islands, the limits as to available land and the lack of employment opportunities, results in a flow of people from the outer islands to the capital in Funafuti with further pressure to migrate to Australia or New Zealand. There is high youth unemployment and few new jobs being created. Given the absence of natural resources (apart from tuna in the territorial waters), and the constraints imposed on the Tuvaluan economy by its remoteness and lack of economies of scale, practical policies are needed for improvements to the livelihoods of the growing numbers of young Tuvaluans who aspire to a more affluent lifestyle than older generations.

Tuvalu comprises four reef islands and five true atolls that result in a contiguous zone: 24 nmi (44 km) exclusive economic zone: 200 nmi (370 km) territorial sea: 12 nmi (22 km). Its nearest neighbours are Kiribati, Nauru, Samoa and Fiji. Tuvalu has worked with Secretariat of the Pacific Community (SPC) and the European Union and enacted the Seabed Minerals Act 2014. The SPC-EU Pacific Deep Sea Minerals Project involves cooperation between the Cook Islands, Fiji, Tonga and Tuvalu with the object of those countries making informed decisions about future deep seabed mineral activities.

The population is 10,507 (2017 Census), which makes Tuvalu the third-least populous sovereign state in the world; as compared to its immediate neighbours, it has a larger population than Nauru, but is smaller than Kiribati which has a permanent population of just over 100,000 (2011). In terms of physical land size, at just 26 square kilometres (10 sq mi) Tuvalu is the fourth smallest country in the world; as compared to its immediate neighbours, Tuvalu is larger than Nauru, which is 21 km^{2} (8.1 sq mi), and smaller than Kiribati, which comprises groups of atolls dispersed over 3.5 million square kilometres, (1,351,000 square miles) of the Pacific Ocean. Tuvalu's Exclusive Economic Zone (EEZ) covers an oceanic area of approximately 900,000 km^{2}.

Tuvalu is considered a safe country of unspoiled natural beauty and friendly people. However, due to its remoteness, the cost of travelling to the island and limited air traffic to the country, limited numbers of tourists visit each year. The majority of visitors to Tuvalu are government officials, aid workers, NGO officials or consultants.

== Sectors ==
=== Agriculture ===
Agriculture in Tuvalu is based on coconut and swamp taro (Cyrtosperma merkusii, known in Tuvalu as pulaka), which is similar to taro (Colocasia esculenta) but "with bigger leaves and larger, coarser roots"; taro is also cultivated in Tuvalu.

The soils of the islands of Tuvalu are usually shallow, porous, alkaline, and coarse-textured, with carbonate mineralogy and high pH values of up to 8.2 to 8.9. The soils are usually deficient in most of the important nutrients needed for plant growth (such as nitrogen, potassium and micronutrients such as iron, manganese, copper and zinc), so garden beds need to be enhanced with mulch and fertiliser to increase their fertility.

=== Fishing resources ===
Tuvaluans are primarily involved in traditional agriculture and fishing. Job opportunities also exist as observers on tuna boats where the role is to monitor compliance with the boat's tuna fishing licence.

The Tuvaluan economy, therefore, relies heavily on its fishing income, with 42% of the Tuvaluan population involved in fishing activity at various levels. The fishing in the Exclusive Economic Zone (EEZ) mainly consists of Skipjack Tuna, Yellowfin Tuna and Bigeye Tuna. UN Data calculated a gross value of fisheries at US$43,773,582 (2007 est), which accounted for the output of coastal commercial fishing, coastal subsistence fishing, locally based offshore fishing, foreign-based offshore fishing, freshwater fishing and aquaculture. In recent years all of the income has been generated through the listed activities in Tuvalu waters, rather than through exports direct from Tuvalu. The activities of international fishing vessels, which in 2008 comprised 42 longline fishing vessels, 3 pole/line vessels and 126 purse seiners, far outweigh domestic activity, with a production volume of 35,541 tonnes worth US$40,924,370 (2009 est) or 93.5% of gross value, although Tuvalu retains a sizeable share in income via licensing. Fishing licensing agreements with Taiwan, Japan, South Korea, New Zealand and the United States generated an income of A$9 million in 2009. In 2013 revenue from fishing licenses doubled to more than 45% of GDP.

On 29 June 2017, the National Fishing Corporation of Tuvalu (NAFICOT), signed a joint venture agreement with the Republic of Korea's SAJO Fishing Industry to operate the fishing vessel M.V. Taina within the Tuvaluan EEZ and other Pacific Island waters.

The 2021 Budget of Tuvalu set out a shift in government policy regarding engagement in fishing activities, with a shift from joint venture arrangements (including the sale of FV Taumoana for $10.4 million) to just receiving revenue from fishing licenses and receiving management fees for flagged ships.

==== Remittances from Tuvaluan seafarers ====
Tuvalu men have for some time been employed abroad, working on container ships, primarily on German-owned ships. Remittances from seafarers is a major source of income for their families in Tuvalu. In 2002, the Asian Development Bank (ADB) approved an assistance package to upgrade the Tuvalu Maritime Training Institute (TMTI) which trains young Tuvaluans so they can work aboard foreign vessels. This project was completed in 2011.

The 1991 census identified 272 seaman working on merchant ships. In 2002 the Tuvaluan Overseas Seaman's Union (TOSU) estimated the number as 417 seaman working on ships. The Great Recession impacted global export-import activities and the demand for shipping, which reduced the need for Tuvaluan seafarers. The ADB identified that the number of Tuvaluans employed as seafarers has decreased steadily from about 340 in 2001 to only 205 in 2010; so that of a total pool of 800 qualified seafarers, including those on leave, almost 450 were unemployed. This decline in seafarer employment has reduced remittances from $2.4 million in 2001 to a projected $1.2 million in 2010. The International Labour Organization (ILO) also estimates that in 2010 there were approximately 200 Tuvaluan seafarers on ships. The International Monetary Fund 2014 Country Report described the effect of the GFC as reducing demand for the services of Tuvaluan seafarers. As of October 2013, there were about 112 Tuvalu seafarers working on cargo ships, compared to 361 in 2006. The consequence is that remittances from seafarers to their families in Tuvalu fell by about 9% of GDP for Tuvalu. In 2012 such remittances were 10% of GDP for Tuvalu.

While a budget deficit of A$0.4 million was projected for 2015, the ADB assessed the budget as being A$14.3m in surplus as the result of high tuna fish license fees. The ADB predicted that the 2% growth rate for 2015 would continue into 2016.

=== Public sector enterprises ===
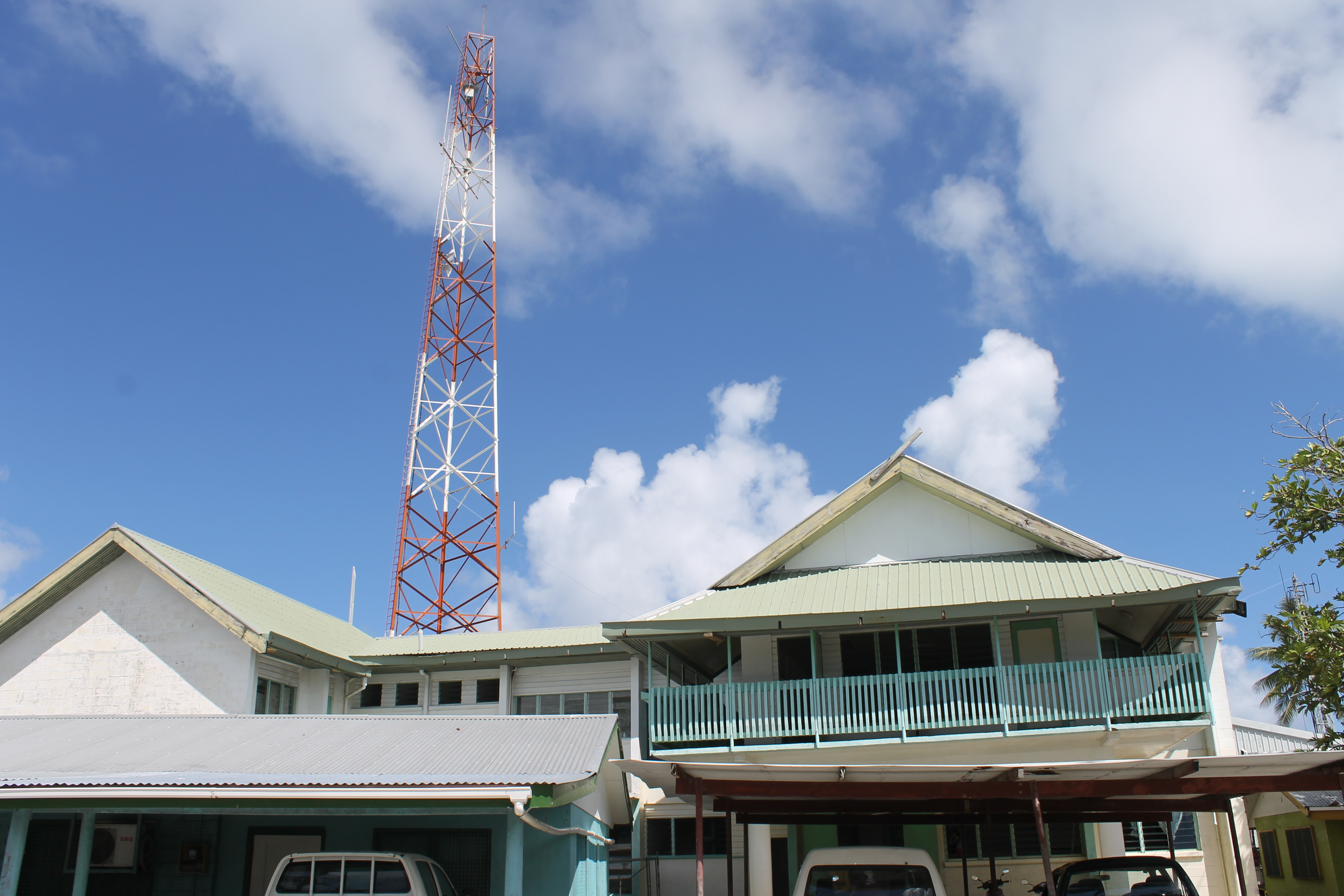
Offices of the Tuvalu Telecommunications Corporation

The public sector enterprises are the National Fishing Corporation of Tuvalu (NAFICOT), National Bank of Tuvalu, Development Bank of Tuvalu, Tuvalu Electricity Corporation, Tuvalu Telecommunications Corporation, Tuvalu Philatelic Bureau, Tuvalu Maritime Training Institute and Vaiaku Lagi Hotel.

The government is the primary provider of medical services through Princess Margaret Hospital on Funafuti, which operates medical clinics on the other islands.

Banking services are provided by the National Bank of Tuvalu. Effective of 7 October 2016, Tuvalu accepted the Article VIII obligations of the IMF Articles of Agreement, to maintaining an exchange system free of restrictions on payments for international transactions.

The Tuvalu Media Department of the Government of Tuvalu operates one station on the AM frequencies under the title of Radio Tuvalu. Fenui – news from Tuvalu is a free digital publication of the Tuvalu Media Department that is emailed to subscribers and operates a Facebook page, which publishes news about government activities and news about Tuvaluan events, such as a special edition covering the results of the 2015 general election.

The Tuvalu National Provident Fund (TNPF) and the Copra Trading Co-operative (CTC) are owned by the members of each organisation. The TNPF provides its members with loans, for which each member's account is used as collateral. The Tuvalu Cooperative Society is the main wholesaler and retailer in Tuvalu.

=== Private sector enterprises ===
The Tuvalu National Private Sector Organisation, the Tuvalu National Chamber of Commerce and Tuvalu Business Centre are active in supporting private sector enterprises. In order to set up a business in Tuvalu, an investor needs a start-up capital of AUD$20,000, a Tuvaluan partner and pay a business registration fee of AUD$100. As of 2010 there are only seven foreign-owned businesses operating in Tuvalu, which were mostly set up by Asian small business operators in the retail and restaurant sector.

Mackenzie Trading Limited, established by Mackenzie Kiritome in 2008, operates small retail outlets in the outer islands to sell merchandise in competition with the Co-operative Society (which is a community-owned enterprise). In 2010 Mackenzie Trading Limited employed 40 people. Other supermarkets on Funafuti include the Edwin Food City store, the Messamasui Supermarket, the SULANI Trading store and the JY Ocean Trading stores. Government regulations prohibit trading on Sundays.

== Government finances ==
=== Government revenue ===
Government revenues largely come from sales of fishing licences, income from the Tuvalu Ship Registry, income from the TTF, and from the lease of its highly fortuitous .tv Internet Top Level Domain (TLD). Tuvalu Post issues stamps and coins to continue the operations of the Tuvalu Philatelic Bureau. Tuvalu does not impose a tax on personal income. Tuvalu has a 30% corporate tax rate. Tuvalu has a VAT rate of 7%. Some items, such as rice, sugar and cooking oil, are exempt from VAT.

=== Fishing Licenses ===
Fishing licences are an important source of revenue. The fishing in the 900,000 km^{2} of water area mainly consists of skipjack tuna, yellowfin tuna and bigeye tuna. Payments from US government made under the South Pacific Tuna Treaty (SPTT) was about $9 million in 1999. In May 2013, representatives from the United States and the Pacific Islands countries agreed to sign interim arrangement documents to extend the Multilateral Fisheries Treaty (which encompasses the South Pacific Tuna Treaty) to confirm access to the fisheries in the Western and Central Pacific for US tuna boats for 18 months. In 2015, Tuvalu refused to sell fishing days to certain nations and fleets that have blocked Tuvaluan initiatives to develop and sustain their own fishery. In 2016, Dr Puakena Boreham, the Minister of Natural Resources, drew attention to Article 30 of the WCPF Convention, which describes the collective obligation of members to consider the disproportionate burden that management measures might place on small-island developing states.

=== .tv Domain ===
The ".tv" domain name generates around A$7 million each year from royalties. In 2019, 8.4% of total government revenue came from .tv royalties. The domain name is sought after due to its similarity to the abbreviation of the word television. VeriSign, Inc managed the .tv domain with the agreement running until 2021. On 14 December 2021, the Ministry of Justice, Communication and Foreign Affairs of the Tuvalu Government announced that they had selected GoDaddy Registry as the new registry service provider, after Verisign did not participate in the process. The success of Twitch.tv and other esports and video game platforms means that Tuvalu can expect to derive increased revenue from the domain.

=== Development of economic and social policy (Te Kakeega/Te Kete) ===
Flag of Tuvalu

Te Kakeega was the statement of the national strategy for the sustainable development of Tuvalu, with economic and social goals intended to be achieved in the period 2005 to 2015. After consultations on each islands the National Summit on Sustainable Development (NSSD), was held at the Tausoalima Falekaupule in Funafuti from 28 June to 9 July 2004. The meeting resulted in the Malefatuga Declaration, which is the foundation of Te Kakeega II - National Strategy for Sustainable Development-2005-2015, which “contained all the known aid projects, programmes, development initiatives and ideas adopted by the donors and the two successive Tuvalu governments (2004-2006 and 2006 to present)”.

The Te Kakeega III - National Strategy for Sustainable Development 2016-2020 (TK III) includes new strategic areas, in addition to the eight identified in TK II. The additional strategic areas are climate change; environment; migration and urbanization; and oceans and seas.

In the national strategy plan for 2021–2030, the name Te Kakeega was replaced by Te Kete which is the name of a domestic traditional basket woven from green or brown coconut leaves. Symbolically, Te Kete has biblical significance for Tuvaluan Christian traditions by referencing the basket or the cradle that saved the life of Moses.

=== Tuvalu Trust Fund ===
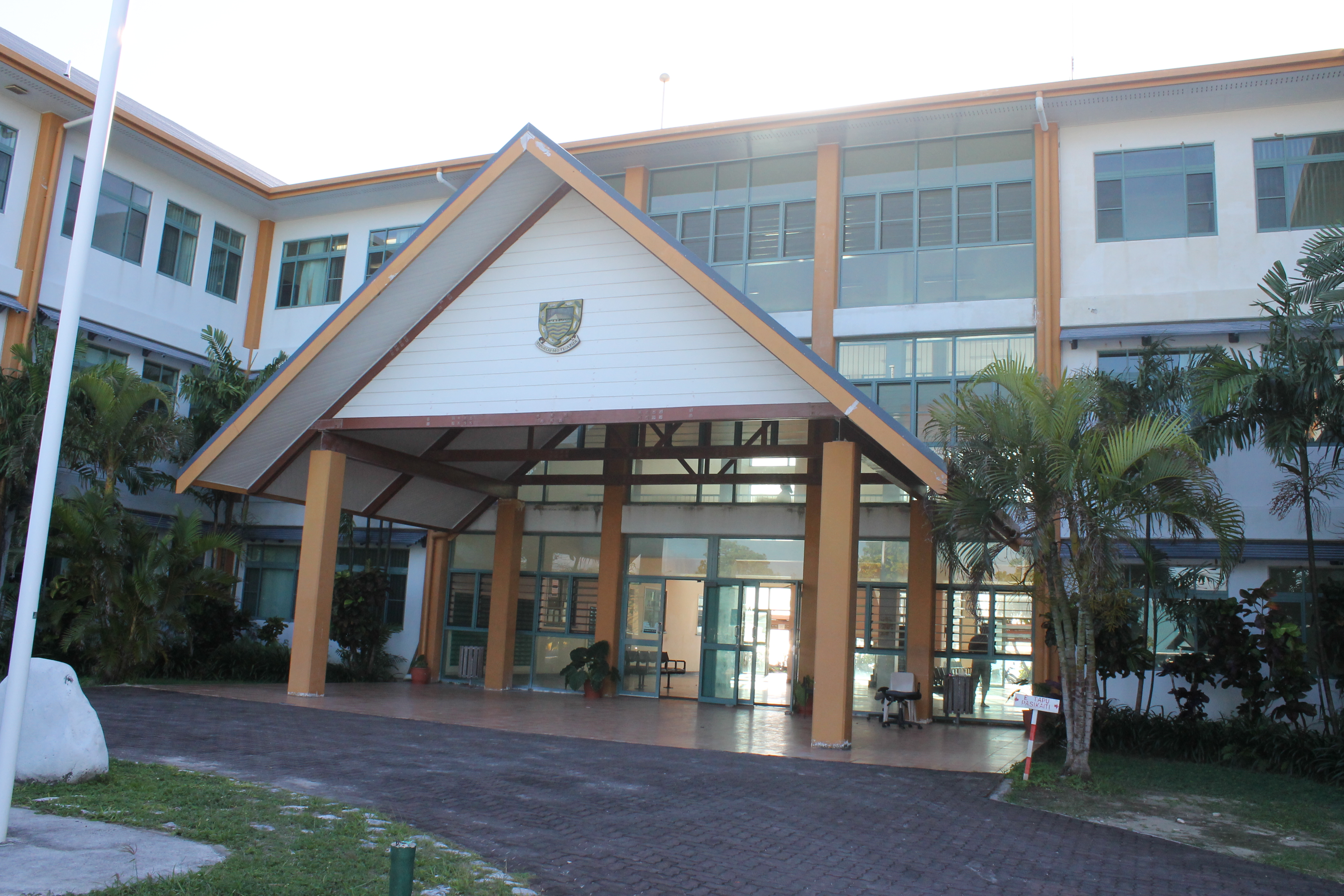
Government office building in Funafuti

The Tuvalu Trust Fund (TTF) was established for the intended purpose of helping to supplement national deficits, underpin economic development, and help the nation achieve greater financial autonomy. The Trust Fund, has contributed roughly (A$79 million) 15% of the annual government budget each year since 1990. With a capital value of about 2.5 times GDP, the Trust Fund provides an important cushion for Tuvalu's volatile income sources from fishing and royalties from the sale of the .tv domain. Meeting the needs of the 2013/14 budget of the Tuvaluan Government will require drawing from funds held in the “Consolidated Investment Fund” (CIF) of the TTF.

The TTF was established in 1987 by the United Kingdom, Australia, and New Zealand with about A$27 million in capital. The TTF, an overseas investment fund, has contributed roughly (A$79 million), 15% of the annual government budget each year between 1990 and 2014. With a capital value of about 3.5 times GDP, the TTF provides a cushion for Tuvalu's income sources from fishing and royalties from the sale of the dot-TV domain.

The IMF 2014 Country Report noted the market value of the TTF dropped during the Great Recession, however by 2014 the total value of the fund had recovered to more than $A140 million (3.5 times GDP). In 2018, the TTF amounted to about A$179 million. In 2021 the TTF amounted to about A$192 million. In 2021, the market value of the TTF rose by 12 percent to its highest level on record (261 percent of GDP). However, the volatility in global equity markets in 2022 resulted in the TTF’s value falling to A$191 million.

The capital of the Trust Fund is known as the “A Account”. The "B Account" or “Consolidated Investment Fund” (CIF) is a revolving “buffer account” that receives funds from the returns or “disbursements” of the "A Account". The operation of the Trust Fund through two accounts assists in stabilising the long-term financial situation of the Government of Tuvalu as well as addressing short-term budget needs. The "B Account", which belongs exclusively to the Government, holds income distributions from the "A Account" until funds are needed to be used for the national budget. It, therefore, serves as a buffer against the volatility of the ‘A Account’ returns, i.e., during years when there are no returns or low returns. Brian Bell, a member of the Tuvalu Trust Fund Advisory Committee from the inception of the Trust Fund in 1987 to 2002, describes the purpose of the Trust Fund as being:

“The Tuvalu Trust Fund was aimed at providing a source of revenue to overcome a chronic budget deficit situation. The revenue is distributed to the Government from the A Account to the B Account. The amount needed is then drawn down into the consolidated revenue account as an additional source of revenue for expenditure on government services through the recurrent budget.”

The 20th-anniversary review of the Tuvalu Trust Fund described the performance as being that:

“In the first twenty years of operation the Fund has grown to $106.6 million in Market Value as of 30 June 2007. The real rate of return on the Fund has averaged 6.2 percent per annum providing $65.7 million in revenue to Tuvalu. Of this $24.1 million has been used to help fund budget deficits, $29.2 million has been reinvested in the Fund and $12.4 million is held in the CIF awaiting drawdown as of 30 June 2007. The Government's subsequent reinvestments back into the Fund since inception raises Tuvalu's contributions to the Fund to $29.8 million including the initial contribution of $1.6 million. It makes Tuvalu the major contributor to the Fund, which is evidence of Tuvalu's commitment to the long term sustainability of the Fund.”

=== Falekaupule Trust Fund ===
In 1999, the Asian Development Bank (ADB) and the government of Tuvalu set up the Falekaupule Trust Fund, which is intended to improve services on the outer islands. The island councils – composed of traditional leaders – are responsible for managing their own finances from a budget allocated from the Tuvaluan government from the Falekaupule Trust Fund. Under the Falekaupule Act, Falekaupule means “traditional assembly in each island...composed in accordance with the Aganu of each island”. Aganu means traditional custom and culture. The initial capital of Falekaupule Trust Fund was A$12 million. The market value of the FTF has increased:

“As at 30 June 2007, the FTF's market value stood at $25.3 million. After eight years of operation, the FTF has made three distributions totalling to $4.7 million. A Reserve Account was established in 2005 having the exact same purpose as the CIF, which is to smooth out the stream of revenue from the main investment. At 30 June 2007, the FTF's Reserve Account was $1.4 million.”

The Great Recession affected the FTF, which is required to maintain its value in real terms before a distribution can be made. As of 30 September 2010, the maintained value was $27.3 million; the result of capital growth and contributions from development partners. This is some $3.5 million higher than the market value of $23.8 million. The gap of 15% between the market value and the maintained value must be recouped before another distribution can be made. Since the commencement of FTF, there have been four years in which distributions were made. The FTF has distributed $6.4 million with some $5.3 million allocated to island development (the balance of $1.1 million is held in reserve by the communities). This equates to an average of $55,000 spent per island per year.

=== Budgets of the government of Tuvalu ===
The Hon. Seve Paeniu, finance minister, presented a half year budget to parliament on 20 November 2023. The 2024 Tuvaluan general election was held on 26 January 2024, subsequently Feleti Teo was appointed as prime minister on 26 February 2024, after he was elected unopposed by the parliament. In 2024 Tuvalu changed its budgeting period from the calendar year to a July to June financial year. The Hon. Panapasi Nelesoni, finance minister, presented the 2024-2025 budget to parliament on 24 June 2024, which is intended to fund the implementation of 21 priority spending programs to bolster Tuvalu’s resilience against impacts of climate change, strengthen economy efficiency and enhance service delivery to uplift welfare and the wellbeing of Tuvaluans. The total budget expenditure for 2024-2025 financial year was projected at A$96.9 million. This includes A$86.1 million for operating expenditure, A$7.7 million for capital investments and A$3.1 million for statutory expenditure. The 2024-2025 budget forecasted a deficit of A$3.9 million, which deficit was funded by a transfer from the Consolidated Investment Fund (CIF), which is a reserve fund maintained through the operation of the Tuvalu Trust Fund. The total revenue was projected at A$93.0 million, comprising A$39.0 million from fishing licences, A$12.7 million from taxation, A$10.9 million from commercial contracts, A$4.1 million from interest-dividends and rent, and A$1.8 million from other government generated income. Assistance from partner countries, which provide general budget support, was projected at A$24.5 million.

Fiscal Summary - 2024-2025 National Budget:

Budget	2022 Actual	2023 Actual	2024 HY projection	2024/25 Budget	2025/26 Projection	2026/27 Projection
Total revenue	A$78,685,000	A$110,558,070	$49,685,670	A$93,032,640	A$94,247,140	$96,092,880
Total expenditure	A$90,652,270	A$105,473,050	A$49,661,250	A$96,984,210	A$99,449,770	A$101,379,150
Fiscal balance	(A$11,967,260)	A$5,085,020	A$24,420	(A$3,951,570)	(A$5,202,630)	(A$5,286,280)
Consolidated Investment Fund (CIF) (note 1)	A$37,578,480	A$39,250,660	A$42,809,780	A$41,484,540	A$38,734,110	A$35,708,490
Amount above MTSB	A$3,320,440	A$2,729,650	A$4,224,540	A$536,030	(A$4,723,530)	(A$10,412,040)
Minimum Target Savings Balance (MTSB)	A$34,258,040	A$36,521,010	A$38,584,240	A$40,948,510	A$43,457,650	A$46,120,530
TTF Maintained Value (note 2)	A$214,112,770	A$228,256,330	A$241,151,510	A$255,928,170	A$271,610,290	A$288,253,330

Note 1: The Consolidated Investment Fund (CIF) is the ‘B Account’ that is part of the Tuvalu Trust Fund (TTF), from which the government of Tuvalu can withdraw funds for expenditure on government services.
Note 2: The operation of the Tuvalu Trust Fund (TTF) is directed to ensuring that the capital of the Fund in the 'A Account' is maintained in real terms, taking account of the effect of inflation (the 'maintained value'). If the market value of the funds in the 'A Account' is greater than the maintained value, then the difference is placed in the 'B Account' or “Consolidated Investment Fund” (CIF).

The Hon. Panapasi Nelesoni presented the 2025-2065 budget to parliament on 23 June 2025. The 2025-2065 budget is a balance budget, which is not intended to draw from the CIF. The total projected revenue for 2025-2026 budget is $114.1 million from both domestic revenues and budget support from partner governments. This is an increase of $10.7 million (10%) from the 2024-2025 estimated actual revenue, which is largely due to improved fisheries revenues and investment return. Revenue from commercial contracts is expected to increase by $2.2 million.

Fiscal Summary - 2025-2026 National Budget:

Budget	2023 Actual	2024-2025 Actual (Est.)	2025-2026 Budget	2026-2027 Projection	2027-2028 Projection
Total revenue	A$96,900,140	A$103,412,830	A$114,115,210	A$115,161,060	A$116,805,320
Total expenditure	A$102,737,460	A$87,814,590	A$114,115,210	A$116,418,270	A$118,756,880
Fiscal balance	(A$5,837,320)	A$15,598,240	A$ -	(A$1,257,210)	(A$1,951,560)
Consolidated Investment Fund (CIF) (Note 1)	A$39,250,670	A$36,448,550	A$37,070,470	A$37,886,030	A$38,681,630
Amount above/below MTSB	A$2,729,650	(A$3,211,460	(A$2,959,400	(A$3,024,500)	($3,088,020)
Minimum Target Savings Balance (MTSB)	A$36,521,020	A$39,660,010	A$40,029,870	A$40,610,530	A$41,769,650
TTF Maintained Value (Note 2)	A$228,256,330	A$247,875,080	A$250,186,690	A$255,690,800	A$261,060,300

Note 1: See Note 1 to Fiscal Summary - 2024-2025 National Budget.
Note 2: See Note 2 to Fiscal Summary - 2024-2025 National Budget.

== Least developed country status ==
The United Nations designates Tuvalu as a least developed country because of its limited potential for economic development, absence of exploitable resources and its small size and vulnerability to external economic and environmental shocks. Tuvalu participates in the Enhanced Integrated Framework for Trade-Related Technical Assistance to Least Developed Countries, which was established in October 1997 under the auspices of the World Trade Organisation. In 2013 Tuvalu deferred its graduation from least developed country status to a developing country to 2015. Prime Minister Enele Sopoaga said that this deferral was necessary to maintain access by Tuvalu to the funds provided by the United Nations's National Adaptation Programme of Action (NAPA), as "Once Tuvalu graduates to a developed country, it will not be considered for funding assistance for climate change adaptation programmes like NAPA, which only goes to LDCs". Tuvalu had met targets so that Tuvalu was to graduate from LDC status. Prime minister, Enele Sopoaga wants the United Nations to reconsider its criteria for graduation from LDC status as not enough weight is given to the environmental plight of small island states like Tuvalu in the application of the Environmental Vulnerability Index.

== International aid ==
Australia and New Zealand continue to contribute capital to the Tuvalu Trust Fund and provide other forms of development assistance. Financial support to Tuvalu is also provided by Japan, South Korea and the European Union.

Tuvalu joined the Asian Development Bank (ADB) in 1993. To improve aid effectiveness, the government of Tuvalu, ADB, AusAID, and NZAID signed the Development Partners Declaration (DPD) in 2009. The DPD is designed to improve aid effectiveness, both in the implementation of specific projects and in assisting the Tuvaluan government achieve performance benchmark indicators.

Tuvalu became a member of the International Monetary Fund (IMF) in July 2010 and also joined the World Bank. In 2013 the World Bank approved US$6.06 million in finance for the existing Tuvalu Aviation Investment Project (TvAIP) for the purpose of improving operational safety and oversight of international air transport and associated infrastructure at Funafuti International Airport.

Tuvalu participates in the Enhanced Integrated Framework for Trade-Related Technical Assistance to Least Developed Countries, which was established in October 1997 under the auspices of the World Trade Organisation. In 2013 Tuvalu deferred its graduation from Least Developed Country status to a developing country to 2015. Prime Minister Enele Sopoaga said that this deferral was necessary to maintain access by Tuvalu to the funds provided by the United Nations's National Adaptation Programme of Action (NAPA), as “Once Tuvalu graduates to a developed country, it will not be considered for funding assistance for climate change adaptation programmes like NAPA, which only goes to LDCs”. Tuvalu had met targets so that Tuvalu was to graduate from LDC status. Prime minister, Enele Sopoaga wants the United Nations to reconsider its criteria for graduation from LDC status as not enough weight is given to the environmental plight of small island states like Tuvalu. Sopoaga said that:

“The present application of those criteria we feel is totally unrealistic and perhaps very very wrong. We need to address that. The application of the current criteria - we have no problem with the criteria but the application - Environmental Vulnerability Index must be one of the two.”

On 18 February 2016, Tuvalu signed the Pacific Islands Development Forum Charter and formally joined the Pacific Islands Development Forum (PIDF). In June 2017, Tuvalu signed the Pacific Agreement on Closer Economic Relations (PACER).

== Climate change mitigation and cyclone recovery programs ==
The South Pacific Applied Geoscience Commission (SOPAC) suggests that, while Tuvalu is vulnerable to climate change, environmental problems such as population growth and poor coastal management also affect sustainable development. SOPAC ranks the country as extremely vulnerable using the Environmental Vulnerability Index. Tuvalu's National Adaptation Programme of Action (NAPA) describes a response to the climate change problem as using the combined efforts of several local bodies on each island that will work with the local community leaders (the Falekaupule). The main office, named the Department of Environment, is responsible for coordinating the non-governmental organizations, religious bodies, and stakeholders. Each of the named groups are responsible for implementing Tuvalu's NAPA, the main plan to adapt to the adverse effects of human use and climate change.

The establishment of the A$5 million Tuvalu Survival Fund (TSF) in the 2016 Tuvaluan budget was intended for climate change mitigation and the recovery expenses that followed the impact of Cyclone Pam, which impacted Tuvalu in 2015.

The Tuvalu Coastal Adaptation Project (TCAP) was launched in 2017 for the purpose of enhancing the resilience of the islands of Tuvalu to meet the challenges resulting from higher sea levels. Tuvalu was the first country in the Pacific to access climate finance from Green Climate Fund, with the support of the UNDP. In December 2022, work on the Funafuti reclamation project commenced. The project is to dredge sand from the lagoon to construct a platform on Fongafale, Funafuti that is 780 meters long and 100 meters wide, which is designed to remain above sea level rise and the reach of storm waves beyond the year 2100. The Australian Department of Foreign Affairs and Trade (DFAT) also provided funding for the TCAP. Further projects that are part of TCAP are capital works on the outer islands of Nanumea and Nanumaga aimed at reducing exposure to coastal damage resulting from storms.

On 26 September 2023, the World Bank (WB) approved US$11.5 million (AUD$18 million) in new grant financing to Tuvalu as part of the WB’s First Climate and Disaster Resilience Development Policy Financing program. This WB support includes a development policy grant of US$7.5 million (AU$11.8 million). This grant is directed to assisting Tuvalu's National Disaster Management Office in coordinating post-disaster response activities; as well to the work of Tuvalu’s National Building Code Assessment Unit, of the Public Works Department, to develop more disaster-resilient infrastructure in Tuvalu. The WB program includes an additional Catastrophe Deferred Drawdown Option (Cat DDO) of US$4 million (AU$6.3 million). The Cat DDO funds are made available to Tuvalu in the event of a natural disaster. The purpose of the WB grant is to support improved monitoring and reporting for the assessment of Tuvalu’s climate and disaster risks, and to help the government fast-track the flow of critical supplies to the islands of Tuvalu following emergencies and natural disasters.

== GDP and other economic performance indicators ==
Exports of Tuvalu by product category (2019) Chemical products Transportation Machines Mineral products Plastics and rubbers Metals Foodstuffs Precious metals Textiles Instruments Animal products Vegetable products Paper goods Footwear and headwear Miscellaneous Stone and glass Wood products Animal and vegetable bi-products Animal hides Arts and antiques Weapons

Information sourced from:

- "Tuvalu: 2010 Article IV Consultation-Staff Report; Public Information Notice on the Executive Board Discussion; and Statement by the Executive Director for Tuvalu". International Monetary Fund Country Report No. 11/46. 8 February 2011.
- "Tuvalu: 2014 Article IV Consultation-Staff Report; Public Information Notice on the Executive Board Discussion; and Statement by the Executive Director for Tuvalu" (PDF). International Monetary Fund Country Report No. 14/253. August 2014.
- "Tuvalu: 2016 Article IV Consultation-Press Release; Staff Report; and Statement by the Executive Director for Tuvalu" (PDF). International Monetary Fund Country Report No. 14/253. 4 October 2016. p. 7.
- "Tuvalu: 2018 Article IV Consultation-Press Release; Staff Report; and Statement by the Executive Director for Tuvalu". International Monetary Fund Country Report No. 18/209. 5 July 2018.
- "Tuvalu: 2021 Article IV Consultation-Press Release; Staff Report; and Statement by the Executive Director for Tuvalu". International Monetary Fund Country Report No. 21/176. August 2021.
- "Tuvalu: 2023 Article IV Consultation-Press Release; Staff Report; and Statement by the Executive Director for Tuvalu". International Monetary Fund Country Report No. 2023/267. 21 July 2023.
- "Tuvalu: 2025 Article IV Consultation-Press Release; Staff Report; and Statement by the Executive Director for Tuvalu". International Monetary Fund Country Report No. 2025/257. 12 September 2025.
- "2024 Tuvalu National Budget" presented on 20 November 2023 by the Honourable Seve Paeniu, Minister of Finance.
- "2024-2025 National Budget" (PDF). Government of Tuvalu. 24 June 2024.
- "2025-2026 National Budget" (PDF). Government of Tuvalu. 23 June 2024.

The Tuvaluan dollar and the Australian dollar (A$) are both official currencies of Tuvalu.

Currency: 1 Tuvaluan dollar ($T) or 1 Australian dollar (A$) = 100 cents

GDP:

- ▲ A$0.068 Billion (nominal, 2019 est.)
- ▲ A$0.07 Billion (nominal, 2020 est.)
- ▲ A$0.074 Billion (nominal, 2021 est.)
- ▲ A$0.049 Billion (PPP, 2019 est.)
- ▲ A$0.05 Billion (PPP, 2020 est.)
- ▲ A$0.052 Billion (PPP, 2021 est.)

GDP - nominal: A$47 million (2015); A$49 million (2016); A$59.1 million (2017); A$64.4 million (2018); A$77.9 million (2019); A$75.2 million (2020); A$80.1 million (2021); A$78.1 million (2022); A$76.1 (2023); A$85.5 (2024 est.); A$90.0 (2025 proj.); A$94.6 (2026 proj.); A$99.7 (2027 proj.); A$104.7 (2028 proj.); A$109.6 (2029 proj.); A$114.4 (2030 proj.).

GNI - GNI per capita: $4,760 (2010)

GDP - per capita: $2,447 (2009); $3,400 (2015 est.); $3,700 (2016 est.); $3,898 (2017 est.); $3,948 (2018 est.); $4,281 (2019 est.); 4,515 (A$7,152)(2021 est.)

GDP – composition by sector:

Agriculture: 24.5% (2012 est.)

Industry: 5.6% (2012 est.)

Services: 70% (2012 est.)

Growth and inflation:

Growth and inflation: (percentage change)	2008 est.	2009 est.	2010 est.	2011 est.	2012 est.	2013 est.	2014 est.	2015 est.	2016 est.
Real GDP growth	6%	-4%	-2.7%	8.4%	0.2%	1.3%	2.2%	9.1%	3.0%
Consumer price inflation (end of period):	10%	0%	-1.9%	0.5%	1.4%	2%	3.3%	4.0%	2.6%

Growth and inflation: (percentage change)	2017	2018	2019	2020	2021	2022	2023	2024 est.	2025 proj.	2026 proj.	2027 proj.	2028 proj.	2029 proj.	2030 proj.
Real GDP growth	3.2%	4.3%	13.8%	-4.3%	1.8%	-11.8%	4.0%	3.1%	3.0%	2.6%	2.7%	2.3%	2.0%	1.8%
Consumer price inflation (period average):	4.1%	2.2%	3.5%	1.9%	6.2%	12.2%	7.2%	1.2%	2.1%	2.3%	2.5%	2.5%	2.5%	2.5%

Total population: 10,632 (2022 Census)

Labor force - by occupation: people make a living mainly through exploitation of the sea, reefs, and atolls and from wages sent home by those working abroad in Australia and New Zealand and sailors working on merchant ships.

Unemployment rate: The 2022 Census showed the national unemployment rate falling to 6.3 percent, down from 28.5 percent in 2017. Labour force participation decreased slightly from 49.3 to 43.0 percent, the employment-to-population ratio increased from 35.2 to 40.3 percent.

Population below poverty line: 26.3% (2010 est.)

Budget (2010 to 2013):

Budget	2010	2011	2012	2013
Total revenues and grants	A$24.9 million	A$26.3 million	A$32.5 million	A$42.7 million
Total expenditures	A$33.2 million	A$29.7 million	A$28.9 million	A$32.2 million

Budget (2014 to 2019):

Budget	2014 actual	2015 actual	2016 actual	2017 actual	2018 actual	2019 actual
Total domestic revenue	A$41.97 m	A$52.12 m	A$71.1 m	A$63.50 m	A$59.23 m	A$55.74 m
Total recurrent expenditure	A$37.07 m	A$46.82 m	A$57.07 m	A$51.94 m	A$38.15 m	A$58.35 m
Structural balance	A$4.90 m	A$5.30 m	A$14.03 m	A$11.57 m	A$21.09 m	(A$2.61 m)
Non recurrent expenditure	A$4.42 m	A$13.8 m	A$19.28 m	A$16.38 m	A$16.23 m	A$26.5 m
Statutory expenditure			A$609,112	A$699,850	A$549,222	A$772,181
Domestic funding gap	A$479,778	(A$8.5 m)	(A$5.86 m)	(A$5.52 m)	A$4.3 m	A$29.89 m
Funded by: development partner assistance – recurrent	A$5 m	A$3.22 m	A$8.5 m	A$8.33 m	A$4.05 m	A$9.17 m
Funded by: development partner assistance – non recurrent	A$6.62 m	A$9.86 m	A$6.9 m	A$4.63 m	A$5.77 m	A$19.35 m
Budget surplus (deficit)	A$12.11 m	A$4.58 m	A$9.55 m	A$7.44 m	A$14.12 m	(A$1.36 m)

Budget (2020 to 2023):

Budget	2020 est.	2021 est.	2022 project.	2023 project.
Total domestic revenue	A$64.99 m	A$54.08 m	A$44.63 m	A$44.83 m
Total recurrent expenditure	A$56.61 m	A$72.76 m	A$73.14 m	A$73.49 m
Structural balance	A$8.38 m	A$18.68 m	A$28.51 m	A$28.66 m
Non recurrent expenditure	A$30.73 m	A$33.84 m	A$16 m	A$16 m
Statutory expenditure	A$769,700	A$1.5 m	A$1.33 m	A$1.33 m
Domestic funding gap	(A$29.89 m)	(A$15.04 m)	(A$14.72 m)	
Funded by: development partner assistance	A$28.66 m	A$34.58 m	A$34.58 m	A$34.58 m
Budget surplus (deficit)	A$5.54 m	-	A$10.82 m	A$11.33 m

Government finance (2015 to 2021):

Government finance: (as a percentage of GDP)	2015	2016	2017	2018	2019	2020	2021
Revenue and grants	136%	138%	108.6%	156.1%	111.8%	129.4%	102.6%
Non-grants Revenue:	102%	113%	86.6%	118.1%	82.9%	95.6%	86.4%
Of which, fishing licence fees	51%	68%	44.1%	79.8%	49%	58.8%	49.2%
Grants:	34%	25%	21.9%	38%	28.9%	33.7%	16.2%
Total expenditure	121%	131%	106.5%	125.8%	112.9%	121.2%	116.5%
Current expenditure:	99%	111%	84%	81.8%	70.8%	78.6%	93.3%
Capital expenditure (note 1):	22%	19%	22.4%	43.9%	42.1%	46.1%	30.1%
Overall balance	15%	7%	2.1%	30.3%	-1.1%	8.2%	-13.8%
Overall balance (excluding grants)	-47%	-67%	-41.5%	-43.6%	-30%	-25.6%	-30.1%
Of which, domestic current balance (note 2)	-47%	-67%	-41.5%	-43.6%	-36.8%	-32.6%	-60.8%

Note 1: Includes Special Development Fund and infrastructure development.

Note 2: Domestic current balance excludes fishing revenue, grants, and capital expenditure.

Government finance (2022 to 2030):

Government finance: (as a percentage of GDP)	2022	2023	2024 est.	2025 proj.	2026 proj.	2027 proj.	2028 proj.	2029 proj.	2030 proj.
Revenue and grants	100.7%	154.1%	110.2%	122.9%	118.3%	114.8%	113.1%	111.7%	110.7%
Non-grants Revenue:	82%	100.7%	82.3%	79.0%	80.6%	79.6%	78.7%	78.0%	77.4%
Of which, fishing licence fees:	48.7%	57.6%	44.6%	41.6%	40.5%	39.3%	38.4%	37.6%	36.9%
Grants:	18.7%	53.4%	27.8%	43.9%	37.7%	35.2%	34.4%	33.7%	33.0%
Total expenditure	115.3%	138.8%	118.4%	122.3%	121.3%	119.3%	118.0%	117.2%	116.4%
Expense:	104.9%	127.7%	111.3%	111.7%	109.9%	107.6%	106.6%	105.7%	105.0%
Net acquisition of Non-financial asset:	10.4%	11.1%	7.1%	10.7%	11.3%	11.5%	11.5%	11.5%	11.5%
Net lending/borrowing	-14.6%	15.3%	-7.2%	-2.3%	-2.8%	-4.0%	-3.4%	-2.6%	-2.5%
Net lending/borrowing Excl. grants	-33.3%	-38.1%	-36.1%	-43.3%	-40.6%	-39.5%	-39.3%	-39.2%	-39.0%
Domestic current balance (note 1)	-71.3%	-84.6%	-73.6%	-74.2%	-69.8%	-67.3%	-66.2%	-65.3%	-64.5%
Net acquisition of financial assets	-15.2%	15.5%	-7.2%	-2.3%	-2.8%	-4.0%	-3.4%	-2.6%	-2.5%
Net incurrence of liabilities	-0.6%	0.2%	1.0%	-3.0%	0.1%	0.3%	1.5%	2.9%	3.5%

Note 1: Domestic current balance excludes fishing revenue, grants, and capital expenditure.

Debt Indicators - IMF report 2025:

Debt Indicators in percentage of GDP	2022	2023	2024 (est.)	2025 (proj.)	2026 (proj.)	2027 (proj.)	2028 (proj.)	2029 (proj.)	2030 (proj.)
Gross public debt	11.5%	11.0%	11.1%	7.75	7.5%	7.4%	8.5%	11.0%	14.1%
External	6.3%	5.8%	4.2%	2.5%	2.5%	2.5%	3.9%	6.5%	9.7%
Domestic and SOE debt	5.2%	5.2%	6.9%	5.3%	5.1%	4.9%	4.7%	4.5%	4.4%

Electricity - installed generating capacity: 5,100 kW (2011)

Electricity - from fossil fuels: 96% of total installed capacity (2015 est.)

Industries: fishing, tourism, copra

Agriculture - products: coconuts; fish

Exports: $2.232 million (2022 est) $1 million (f.o.b., 2004); $600,000 (2010 est.)

Exports - commodities: copra, fish

Exports - partners: Thailand 88%, Japan 6%, Philippines 3%, Ireland 1%, USA 1% (2023)

Imports: $57.388 million (2022 est), $12.91 million (c.i.f., 2005); $238.6 million (2012 est.); $136.5 million (2013 est.)

Imports - commodities: food, animals, mineral fuels, machinery, manufactured goods

Imports - partners: China 42%, Fiji 24%, Japan 11%, Australia 11%, NZ 4% (2023)

Economic aid - recipient: $30.4 (2009); $19.7 million (2010 est.) note - major donors are Australia, New Zealand, European Union, Japan, and the US

Exchange rates: Tuvaluan dollars or Australian dollars per US dollar - 1.505 (2023 est.), 1.0902 (2010), 1.2822 (2009), 1.2137 (2007), 1.3285 (2006); 0.9695 (2011 est.); 0.97 (2012 est.); 1.1094 (2013 est.); 1.67 (2014 est.); 1.33 (2015 est.)

Fiscal year: In 2024 Tuvalu changed its budgeting period from the calendar year to a July to June financial year.

== See also ==
- .tv

== External sources ==
- "Te Kakeega III - National Strategy for Sustainable Development 2016-2020" (PDF). Government of Tuvalu. 2016.
- "Te Kete - National Strategy for Sustainable Development 2021-2030" (PDF). Government of Tuvalu. 2020.
- Office of the Auditor General of Tuvalu
