= Health in Tuvalu =

As in much of Oceania, obesity is a major health issue in Tuvalu with 65% of men and 71% of women being overweight. In 2012 the birth rate on the islands was estimated at 23 per 1,000 people and life expectancy was 65.

The cuisine of Tuvalu is based on the staple of pulaka, taro, breadfruit, bananas and coconut and the many species of fish found in the ocean and lagoons of the atolls. The Tuvaluans benefited from the canned food supplied by the American forces during the Second World War, although the change in diet continued after the war, which resulted in long-term impacts on health. Tuvaluans adopted a diet that includes high levels of corned beef, rice and sugar, consumed even when fish and traditional vegetables are available. The change of diet to include more processed foods is believed to contribute to increasing levels of diabetes, hypertension and cardiovascular diseases among Tuvaluans.

== Medical problems in Tuvalu ==
Prevalence of obesity in the adult population, top countries (2016), Tuvalu has the fourth highest rate in the world.

In the 19th and 20th century, after the beginning of commerce with Europe and the United States, the primary medical problem in the islands was tuberculosis. Tuberculosis has declined from an average 36 cases per year to 19 per year from 1975 to 2009. In 2016 the incidence of tuberculosis was reported as continuing to decline with average of 15 new cases of sputum positive infections every year.

Droughts in Tuvalu, such as the 2011 Tuvalu drought result in water shortages and sanitation Problems. The health consequences are increased acute respiratory infections (ARIs), viral illnesses, skin diseases, septic sores, and cholera, diarrhoea and typhoid infections.

Since the late 20th century the biggest health problem in Tuvalu, and the leading cause of death, has been heart disease, which is closely followed by diabetes and high blood pressure. In 2016 the majority of deaths resulted from cardiac diseases, with diabetes mellitus, hypertension, obesity, and cerebral-vascular disease among the other causes of death.

In 2014, the World Health Organization confirmed an outbreak of dengue fever in Tuvalu. The illness has re emerged in several Pacific Island countries after a period of twenty years. A further outbreak of dengue fever occurred in 2019, from 25 March to 5 July 496 suspected and 226 confirmed cases were reported. 54 cases required hospitalisation from which 2 children died.

In February 2024, the Tuvalu Department of Health launched a typhoid vaccination campaign that is funded by the Australian Department of Foreign Affairs and Trade (DFAT) and UNICEF. The vaccines will be administered to people between the ages of 9 months to 65 years.

== Management of COVID-19 ==
Tuvalu limited travel to Funafuti International Airport in early 2020. The government of Tuvalu put in place The COVID-19 (Threatened Emergency) Regulation 2021, then published the Standard Operating Procedure for International Travel to Tuvalu.

Dr Tapugao Falefou, was appointed the chair of the national Covid-19 taskforce. Tuvalu remained free of COVID-19 infections and implemented a vaccine program. By April 2022, 85% of 12-17-year-olds had received their first dose of vaccine, and about 90% of its adult population were fully vaccinated. In 2023, the IMF Article IV consultation with Tuvalu concluded that a successful vaccination strategy allowed Tuvalu to lift coronavirus disease (COVID-19) containment measures at the end of 2022.

== Healthcare ==
The Princess Margaret Hospital on Funafuti is the only hospital in Tuvalu and the primary provider of medical services. The Tuvaluan medical staff at the hospital in 2011 comprised the Director of Health & Surgeon, the Chief Medical Officer Public Health, an anaesthetist, a paediatric medical officer and an obstetrics and gynaecology medical officer. Allied health staff include two radiographers, two pharmacists, three laboratory technicians, two dieticians and 13 nurses with specialised training in fields including surgical nursing, anaesthesia nursing/ICU, paediatric nursing and midwifery. It also employs a dentist. The Department of Health also employs nine or ten nurses on the outer islands to provide general nursing and midwifery services.

== Non-government organizations ==
There are no private formal medical services available in Tuvalu. Non-government organizations provide health services, such as the Tuvalu Red Cross Society; Fusi Alofa (the care and rehabilitation of disabled children); the Tuvalu Family Health Association (training and support on sexual and reproductive health); and the Tuvalu Diabetics Association (training and support on diabetes).
