= Agriculture in Tuvalu =

Agriculture in Tuvalu is based on coconut and swamp taro (Cyrtosperma merkusii, known in Tuvalu as pulaka), which is similar to taro (Colocasia esculenta) but "with bigger leaves and larger, coarser roots"; taro is also cultivated in Tuvalu.

The soils of the islands of Tuvalu are usually shallow, porous, alkaline, and coarse-textured, with carbonate mineralogy and high pH values of up to 8.2 to 8.9. The soils are usually deficient in most of the important nutrients needed for plant growth (such as nitrogen, potassium and micronutrients such as iron, manganese, copper and zinc), so garden beds need to be enhanced with mulch and fertiliser to increase their fertility.

== Crops ==
The staple food of Tuvalu is coconut, pulaka and taro. Bananas, papaya and breadfruit are supplemental crops. The dried flesh of the coconut (copra) is the main agricultural export of Tuvalu, with other agricultural products consumed locally. Because of the young geological age of the reef islands and atolls and high level of soil salination the soil is relatively poor. Wealth and status in traditional Tuvaluan culture was determined by possession of pulaka and taro pits (pela) and coconut trees.

== Traditional use of broadleaf forest ==
Charles Hedley (1896) identified the uses of plants and trees that were harvested from the native broadleaf forest as including:

- Food plants: Coconut; and Ferra, native fig (Ficus aspem).
- Fibre: Coconut; Ferra; Fala, Screw Pine, Pandanus; Fau or Fo fafini, or woman's fibre tree (Hibiscus tiliaceus).
- Timber: Fau or Fo fafini; Pouka, (Hernandia peltata); Ngia or Ingia bush, (Pemphis acidula); Miro, (Thespesia populnea); Tonga, (Rhizophora mucronata).
- Dye: Valla valla, (Premna tahitensis); Tonga, (Rhizophora mucronata); and Nonou, (Morinda citrifolia).
- Scent: Fetau, (Calophyllum inophyllum); Jiali, (Gardenia taitensis); and Boua (Guettarda speciosa); Valla valla, (Premna tahitensis); and Crinum.
- Medicinal: Tulla tulla, (Triumfetta procumbens); Nonou, (Morinda citrifolia); Tausoun, (Heliotropium foertherianum); Valla valla, (Premna tahitensis); Talla talla gemoa fern, (Psilotum triquetrum); Lou, (Cardamine sarmentosa); and Lakoumonong, (Wedelia strigulosa).

While some use is made of traditional flora, modern Tuvalu imports building materials and other products to replace the things traditionally harvested from the native broadleaf forest.

== Coconut ==
The cuisine of Tuvalu, is based on the staple of coconut which is used in different forms with coconut water, coconut milk and the flesh of the coconut being used to flavour dishes. Various desserts made on the islands include coconut and coconut milk, instead of the animal milk. Apart from its food value coconut palm leaves and wood have traditional uses as building materials.

From the mid 19th century traders in Tuvalu were active in the acquisition of copra and coconut oil, which were mainly used to manufactured into other products. In 1892 Captain Davis of HMS Royalist, reported on trading activities and traders on each of the islands visited:

Island	Production	Annual export of copra
Nukulaelae	Copra, taro, popoi, a few bananas, a little sugar cane	About 10 tons copra
Funafuti	Copra, taro, pulaka (swamp taro), Bananas, sugar cane, bread fruit	About 25 to 30 tons of copra
Nukufetau	Copra, taro, pulaka, pandanus, a little sugar cane, a few bananas	About twenty tons copra
Nui	Copra, taro, pulaka, pandanus, a few bananas, a very little sugar cane and bread fruit.	About 100 tons of copra - in a good year
Niutao	Copra, taro, pulaka, pandanus	About 50 tons copra - in a good year
Nanumaga	Copra, taro, pandanus	15 to 20 tons copra - in a good year
Nanumea	Copra, pandanus, taro	30 to 40 tons copra
Vaitupu	Copra, taro, pulaka, pandanus	About 50 tons copra

In modern times there is lower demand for copra and coconut oil as other commodities can be substituted for what were the earlier uses of these products.

== Pulaka ==
Grown in large pits (pela) of composted soil below the water table, pulaka is the main source for carbohydrates. Pulaka makes up the bulk of the islanders' traditional diet; it is usually supplemented by fish. Since the unprocessed corms are toxic, they must always be cooked, usually in an earth oven. The pulaka pits are at risk from increasing sea levels, which increase saltwater levels subsoil in the atolls and islands of Tuvalu. On Fongafale islet of Funafuti a survey of the pits that have previously been used to grow pulaka established that the pits were either too saline or very marginal for swamp taro production, although a more salt-tolerant species of taro (Colocasia esculenta) was being grown in Fongafale.

Donald Gilbert Kennedy, the resident District Officer in the administration of the Gilbert and Ellice Islands Colony from 1932 to 1938, described the pulaka pits as usually being shared between different families, with their total area providing an average of about 40 square yards (36.576 square metres) per head of population, although the area of pits varied from island to island depending on the extent of the freshwater lens that is located under each island. Kennedy also describe the land ownership as having evolved from the pre-European contact system known as kaitasi (lit. “eat-as-one”), in which the land held by family groups under the control of the senior male member of the clan – a system of land based on kinship-based bonds, which changed over time to become a land ownership system where the land was held by individual owners - known as Vaevae (“to divide”). Under the Vaevae system, a pit may contain numerous small individual holdings with boundaries marked by small stones or with each holding divided by imaginary lines between trees on the edge of the pits. The custom of inheritance of land, and the resolution of disputes over the boundaries of holdings, land ownership and inheritance was traditionally determined by the elders of each island.

== Agricultural pests ==
The agricultural pests that are a threat to the agriculture of Tuvalu are:

- Coconut scale insect (Aspidiotus destructor), which has severely infested the coconut palms, breadfruit, papaya, bananas, and pandanus and slightly affects the main root crops (pulaka and taro) and other cultural trees such as frangipani (Plumeria) and Premna serratifolia. The use of chemical control and the destruction of infested plant materials, has been not been successful in preventing repeated infestations by the pest;
- Pink mealybug or hibiscus mealybug (Maconellicoccus hirsutus), black mirid garden fleahoppers (Microtechnites bractatus), planthoppers and aphids, all of which cause leaf deformation and yellowing due either directly to the pests or indirectly through the pest allowing plant viruses to enter the plants;
- Yellow Crazy Ants (YCA) (Anoplolepis gracilipes), which form dense, multi-queen super-colonies and releases an acid that burns on skin contact. On Funafuti, the YCA has destroyed crops and attacked animals such as chickens, land crabs, hermit crabs, and coconut crabs, and it threatens seabird populations;
- Fruit flies of the genus Bactrocera spp. pose a threat as this pest is present in neighbouring islands.

=== Invasive plants ===
Wedelia or trailing daisy (Sphagneticola trilobata), a plant native to the Caribbean, has become endemic in Tuvalu. It is competing with low-growing herbaceous species along beaches and roadsides, where it inhibits the growth of seedlings of medicinal plants and other native species of cultural importance. Thaman (2016) described about 362 species or distinct varieties of vascular plants that have been recorded at some time on Tuvalu, of which only about 59 (16%) are possibly indigenous.

== Changes in diet ==
Besides rising saltwater levels, "changing lifestyles and eating habits" also threaten the cultivation of the crop, a process that began during and after World War II, when American occupying troops supplied the islands with imported foods and many pulaka pits are no longer maintained. Imported foods are often high in sugar, leading also to an increase in the need for dental care. The Tuvaluans benefited from the canned food supplied by the American forces, although the change in diet continued after the war, which resulted in long-term impacts on health. Tuvaluans adopted a diet that includes high levels of corned beef, rice and sugar. This food is consumed even when fish and traditional vegetables are available. This diet is believed to contribute to increasing levels of diabetes, hypertension and other cardiovascular diseases among Tuvaluans.

On Funafuti, the Fatoaga Fiafia Garden grows vegetables, including cucumbers, beans, pumpkins and Chinese cabbages, and tests salt-tolerant crops, such as a hybrid pawpaw.
