= LAPA =

LAPA may stand for:

- Líneas Aéreas Privadas Argentinas
- Local Adaptation Plans of Action
