= Tuvaluan cuisine =

Culinary traditions of Tuvalu

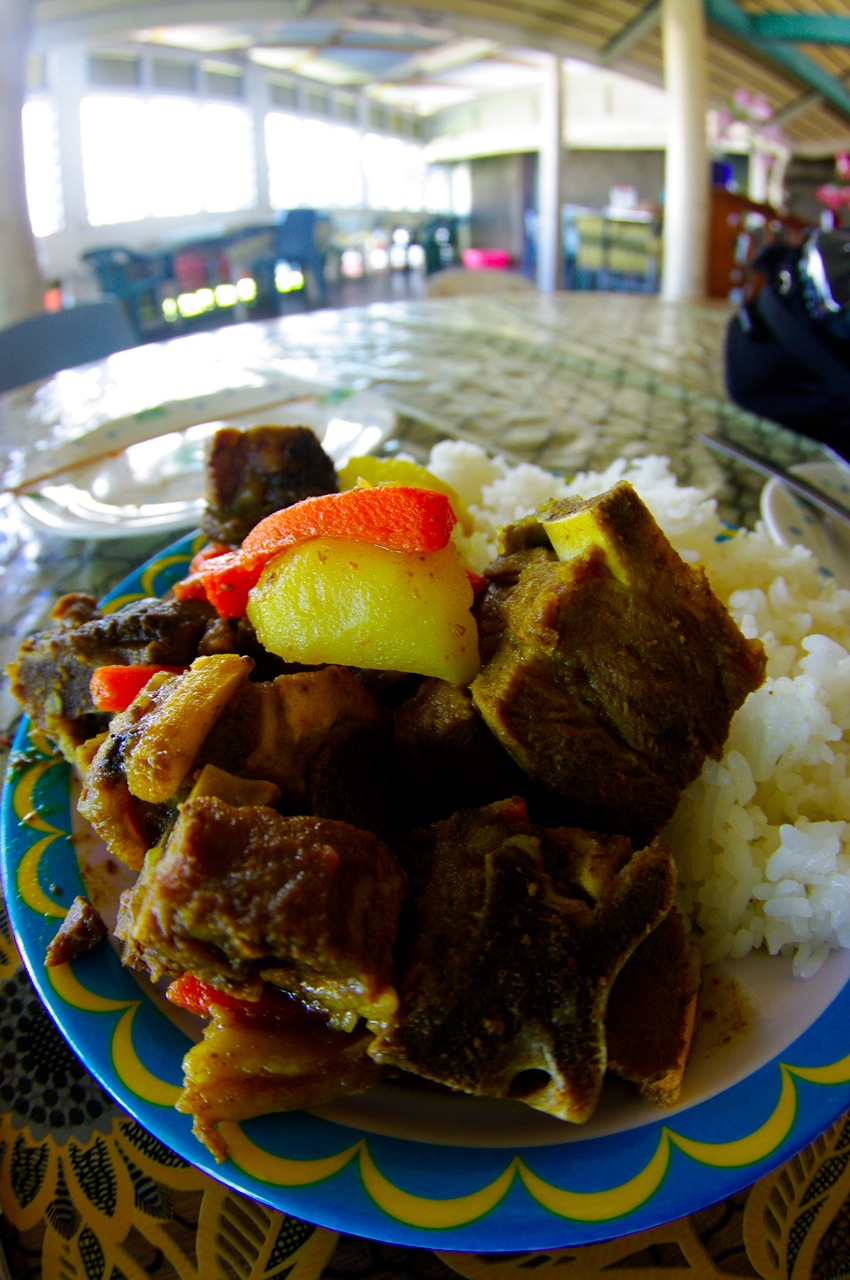
- A Tuvaluan meal.
- Country or region: Tuvalu
- National dish: Pulaka
- National drink: Kava

The cuisine of Tuvalu, a state in the Central Pacific (Oceania), is based on the staple of coconut and the many species of fish found in the ocean and the lagoons of the atolls of Tuvalu. Pulaka (Cyrtosperma merkusii), or "swamp taro", is an important source of carbohydrates. Rice now forms an important part of the diet. Coconut is used in different forms with coconut water, coconut milk and the flesh of the coconut being used to flavour dishes. Various desserts made on the islands include coconut and coconut milk, instead of animal milk.

== Traditional foods of Tuvalu ==
The traditional foods eaten in Tuvalu are pulaka, which is a "swamp crop" similar to taro, but "with bigger leaves and larger, coarser roots", bananas, breadfruit and coconut. Tuvaluans also eat seafood, including coconut crab, fish from the lagoon and ocean, seabirds (taketake or black noddy and akiaki or white tern) and also pork.

Seafood provides protein. Bananas and breadfruit are supplemental crops. Coconut is used for its juice, to make other beverages (such as toddy) and to improve the taste of some dishes. Pork is eaten mostly at fateles (or parties with dancing to celebrate special events).

Agriculture in Tuvalu is focused on coconut trees and growing pulaka in large pits of composted soil below the water table, Pulaka is the main source for carbohydrates. Pulaka makes up the bulk of the islanders' traditional diet; it is usually supplemented by fish. Since the unprocessed corms are toxic, they must always be cooked, usually in an earth oven. Many of the recipes call for the addition of coconut cream or toddy, or both. On Niutao, coconut cream (lolo) is poured over beaten pulp of pulaka, to make a dish called tulolo. A similar dish on Nukufetau, with halved corms, is called tulolo pulaka; with beaten corms the dish is called fakapapa. Fekei is made on all the islands, and consists of pulaka which is grated (typically this is woman's work) with the aid of limestone with holes drilled in it. The resulting pulp is wrapped in pulaka leaves and steamed, and mixed with coconut cream.

Puleleti is a sweet made from desiccated coconut mixed with coconut syrup.

== Influences on the cuisine of Tuvalu ==
Because these islands are isolated, the neighbours' influences are not felt in the Tuvaluan cuisine. Because Tuvalu was a British colony during the 19th century, Tuvaluan cuisine includes British elements and meals with the local flavours.

The pulaka pits are at risk from increasing sea levels, which increase saltwater levels subsoil in the atolls and islands of Tuvalu. Besides rising saltwater levels, "changing lifestyles and eating habits" also threaten the cultivation of the crop, a process that began during and after World War II, when American occupying troops supplied the islands with imported foods and many pulaka pits were no longer maintained. Imported foods are often high in sugar, leading also to an increase in the need for dental care.

The Tuvaluans benefited from the canned food supplied by the American forces, although the change in diet continued after the war, which resulted in long-term effects on health. Tuvaluans adopted a diet that includes high consumption of corned beef, rice and sugar. This food is consumed even when fish and traditional vegetables are available. This diet is believed to contribute to increasing levels of diabetes, hypertension and other cardiovascular diseases among Tuvaluans.

== Variations in diet ==
The diets on Tuvalu's nine widely-spread islands vary, but they are all based on seafood, fish meals and local plants such as taro. Most of the population is concentrated on the Funafuti Island and even though this is very small, the cuisine there is most representative for all the state. In the capital, Funafuti, seafood dishes and meats are more common than mashed vegetables or soups, while in outer islands, taro is the staple food and it is considered to be multi-functional, with dishes including taro leaf and coconut soup, taro leaf au gratin, taro chips, taro cakes and palusami. Palusami, also called samoa, is served with taro or breadfruit and made of taro leaves (which can be replaced with spinach), coconut cream, lime juice, onions and spices.
