= Groundwater in the Comoros =

Groundwater resources and occurrence in the Comoros Islands are variable owing to geological variability. Young volcanic islands, including the active Karthala volcano on Grande Comore, host two types of aquifers; a widespread basal aquifer characterised by deep groundwater table, high hydraulic conductivity, high recharge rate and saltwater intrusion issues in coastal areas, and local perched aquifer systems. Older, weathered volcanic islands such as Mayotte are characterised by more complex groundwater occurrence through discontinuous successions of perched aquifers. The Glorioso coral islands host a shallow freshwater lens fed by rainfall infiltration where freshwater-saltwater interactions and spatial patterns are strongly influenced by topography and evapotranspiration processes.
