= Postage stamps and postal history of the Gilbert and Ellice Islands =

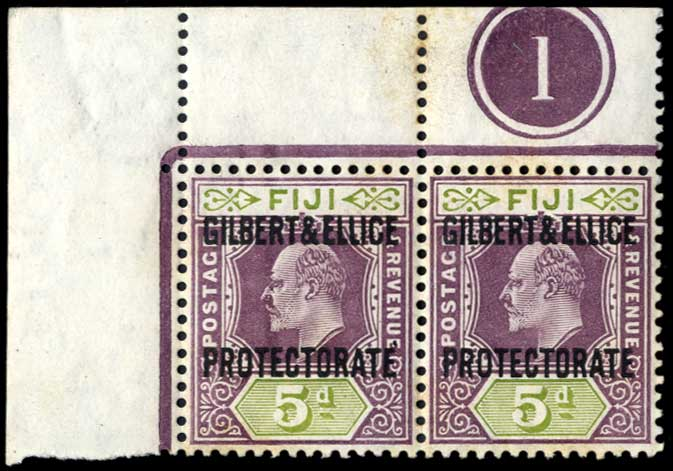
1911 stamps of the Gilbert and Ellice Islands overprinted on stamps of Fiji

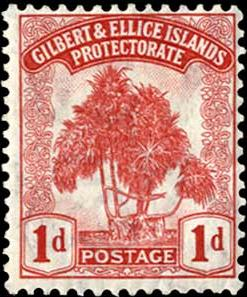
1911 stamp of the Gilbert and Ellice Islands Protectorate

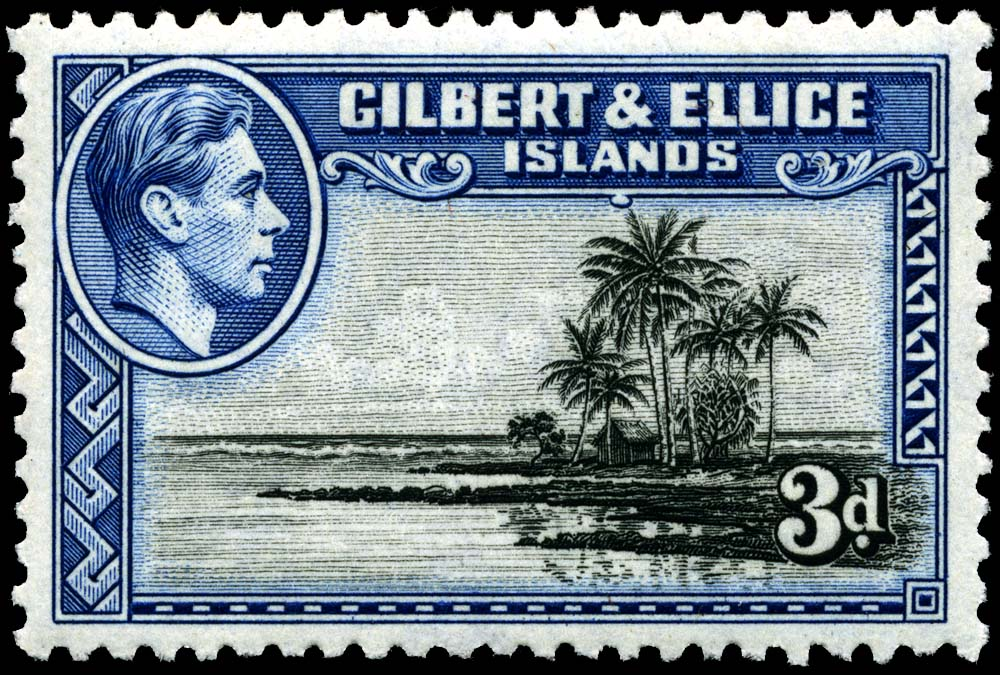
3-pence value showing an island scene, 1939

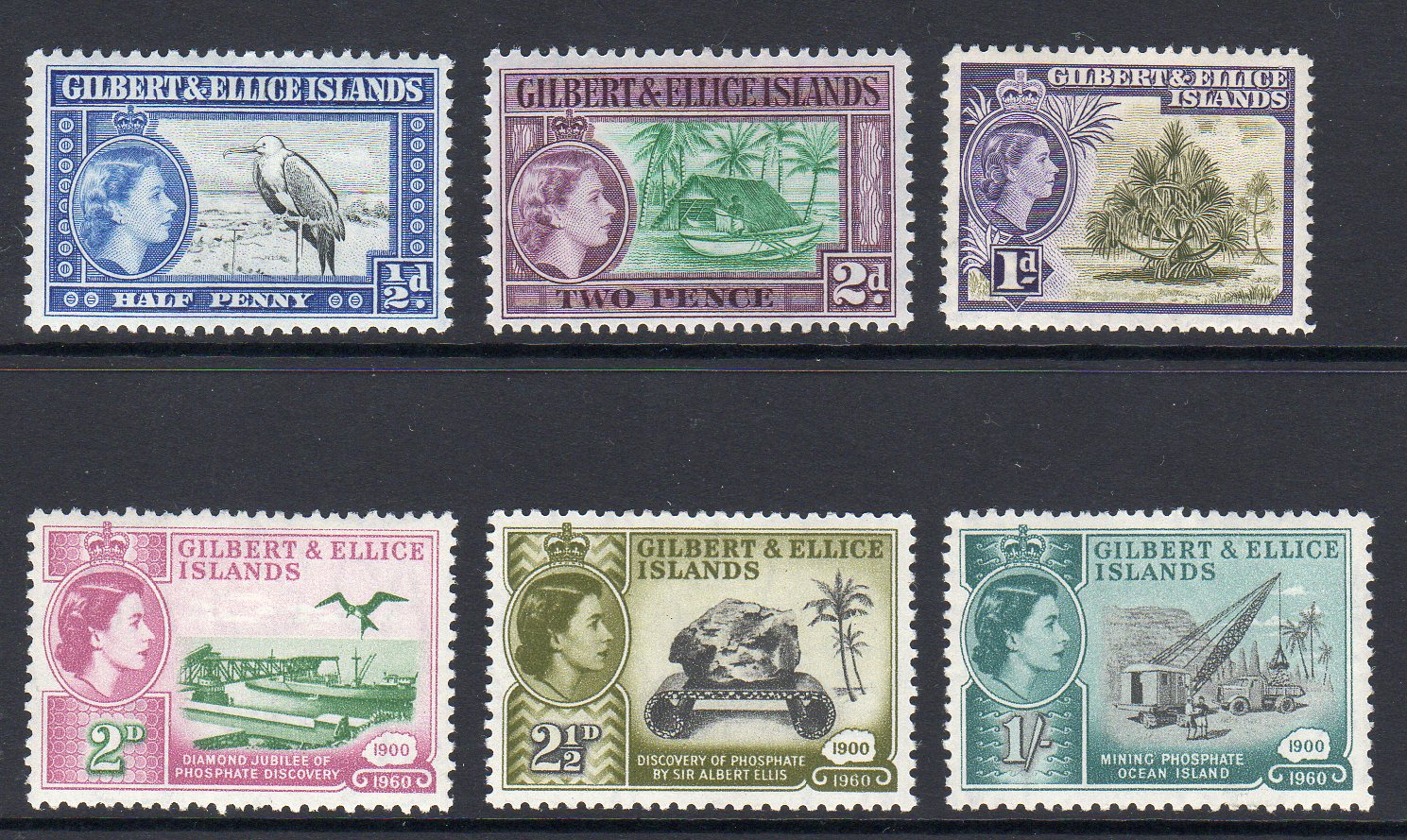
1956 stamps of the Gilbert and Ellice Islands

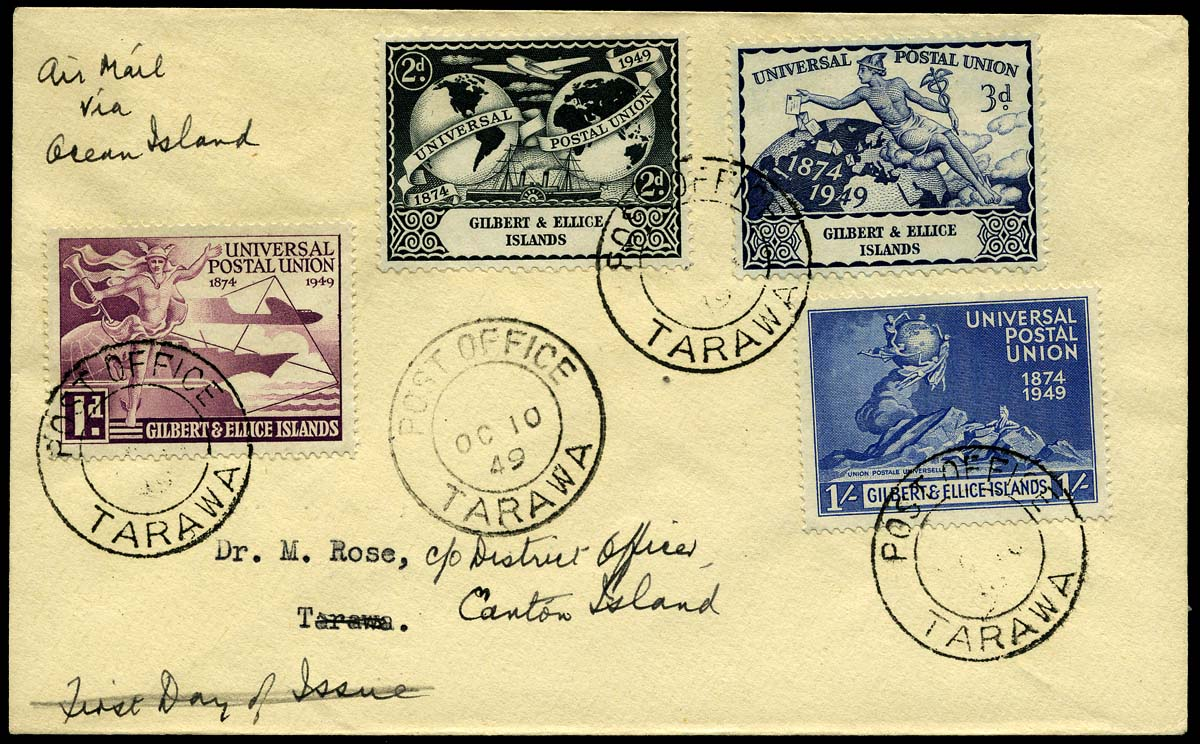
A first-day cover franked with all of the four UPU stamps of 1949

This is a survey of the postage stamps and postal history of the Gilbert and Ellice Islands.

The islands in the South Pacific Ocean were a British protectorate from 1892 and colony from 1916.

== First stamps ==
The first mail service to the Gilbert and Ellice Islands was ad hoc, depending on which ships were calling at the various islands. A regular service began in 1911; Edward VII postage stamps of Fiji were overprinted GILBERT & ELLICE / PROTECTORATE and put on sale on 1 January of that year, followed in March by a set of four stamps depicting a Pandanus tree, inscribed GILBERT & ELLICE ISLANDS / PROTECTORATE.

== George V and George VI ==
These were followed in 1912 by George V stamps of the common type, inscribed GILBERT & ELLICE ISLANDS. A new definitive series came out starting 14 January 1939, featuring local scenery and a profile of George VI. These were updated in 1956 with a profile of Elizabeth II.

== Queen Elizabeth II ==
A set of four stamps on 1 May 1960 commemorated the 60th anniversary of the discovery of phosphate at Ocean Island. The definitive series of 1965 depicted daily activities of the natives, but a decimal currency conversion necessitated surcharges in 1966 and a reissue of the stamps in 1968. The colony issued about 10-15 stamps per year thereafter, usually as sets of four, until the end of 1975.

== Establishment of Kiribati and Tuvalu ==
In 1976, the islands became two separate colonies and later independent as Kiribati and Tuvalu.

The Gilbert Islands issued stamps under that name before attaining independence on 12 July 1979 as the Republic of Kiribati. The first stamps of Kiribati were a pair issued on 19 November 1979 to mark the independence of the country.

The Tuvalu Philatelic Bureau was established on 1 January 1976, which was the day the Gilbert and Ellice Islands colony was dissolved and Tuvalu established as a separate British dependency. The first stamp issue was a set of provisional overprinted definitive stamps and a commemorative set of three stamps. The first postage stamp cancellation devices were put into use the same day.

== See also ==
- Postage stamps and postal history of Kiribati
- Postage stamps and postal history of Tuvalu

== References and sources ==
Sources

- Scott catalogue
- Rossiter, Stuart & John Flower. The Stamp Atlas. London: Macdonald, 1986. ISBN 0-356-10862-7
