= Postage stamps and postal history of Kiribati =

A 1982 $1 Specimen stamp of Kiribati

This is a survey of the postage stamps and postal history of Kiribati.

The Republic of Kiribati, is an island nation located in the central tropical Pacific Ocean. It is composed of 32 atolls and one raised coral island, dispersed over 3.5 million square kilometres, and straddling the equator.

Kiribati was formerly the Gilbert Islands, part of the Gilbert and Ellice Islands which split into Kiribati and Tuvalu upon gaining independence from the United Kingdom in 1978 and 1979.

== First stamps ==
The first stamps of Kiribati were a pair issued on 19 November 1979 to mark the independence of the country.

== See also ==
- Postage stamps and postal history of the Gilbert and Ellice Islands
- Postage stamps and postal history of Tuvalu
