= Tuvalu Philatelic Bureau =

Agency overview
- Formed: 1976
- (etc.)
- Jurisdiction: Tuvalu
- Headquarters: Funafuti; 8°31′S 179°13′E
- Employees: 12
- Parent agency: Ministry of Finance and Economic Planning
- Website: https://stamps.tuvalupost.tv/

The Tuvalu Philatelic Bureau (now trading as Tuvalu Post Limited) is the government body in Tuvalu that issues new stamps and first day covers, which are available for purchase by stamp collectors around the world. The Bureau is located in Funafuti.

The sale of stamps has since the independence of Tuvalu in 1976 has been an important source of revenue for the country and government. However, such revenue has significantly declined in recent years.

== History ==
The Tuvalu Philatelic Bureau was established on 1 January 1976, which was the day the Gilbert and Ellice Islands Colony was dissolved and Tuvalu was established with separate British dependency status. The first postage stamp cancellation devices were put into use the same day. The first issue was a set of provisional overprinted definitive stamps and a commemorative set of three stamps. Tuvalu became fully independent within the Commonwealth on 1 October 1978.

The philatelic business activities are authorised by the Tuvalu Philatelic Bureau Ordinance (1982). Karl Tili was the first Tuvaluan general manager of the Tuvalu Philatelic Bureau from 1989 to 31 December 2011.

In 2013, the Tuvalu government was proposing to merge the Bureau with the Tuvalu Post Office, which is regulated by the Tuvalu Post Office Act 1977. The Tuvalu Post Office is not separately constituted and is a government department.

== Tuvalu Philatelic Bureau Newsletter ==
The Tuvalu Philatelic Bureau has published a newsletter since March 1976, initially under the name News and Views. In 1999 the name was changed to Tuvalu Philatelic Bureau Newsletter. The Newsletter provides information about new stamp issues and articles about Tuvalu.
