= Postage stamps and postal history of Tuvalu =

A 1976 specimen stamp of the Gilbert and Ellice Islands overprinted for use in Tuvalu

This is a survey of the postage stamps and postal history of Tuvalu.

Tuvalu is a Polynesian island nation located in the Pacific Ocean, midway between Hawaii and Australia. Its nearest neighbours are Kiribati, Nauru, Samoa and Fiji. It comprises four reef islands and five true atolls. Its population of 10,472 makes it the third-least populous sovereign state in the world. In terms of physical land size, at just 26 square kilometres (10 sq mi) Tuvalu is the fourth smallest country in the world.

Tuvalu was formerly the Ellice Islands, part of the Gilbert and Ellice Islands which split into Kiribati and Tuvalu upon gaining independence from the United Kingdom in 1978 and 1979.

The Tuvalu Philatelic Bureau is the government body in Tuvalu that issues new stamps and first day covers, which are purchased by stamp collectors around the world. The Tuvalu Philatelic Bureau is located in Funafuti.

The first stamps of Tuvalu were overprinted stamps of the Gilbert and Ellice Islands issued on 1 January 1976.

== History ==
The Tuvalu Philatelic Bureau was established on 1 January 1976, which was the day the Gilbert and Ellice Islands Colony was dissolved and Tuvalu was established with separate British dependency status. The first postage stamp cancellation devices were put into use the same day. The first issue was a set of provisional overprinted definitive stamps and a commemorative set of three stamps. Tuvalu became fully independent within the Commonwealth on 1 October 1978.

In the late 1980s, Tuvalu became involved in a court case with Clive Feigenbaum, who was the Chairman of the Philatelic Distribution Corporation (P.D.C.). The legal case made claims in relation to a contract with the government of Tuvalu relating to allegations as to the deliberate production of stamps with errors for sale to collectors at inflated prices. According to the New York Times, "P.D.C. produced 14,000 deliberate errors: stamps with inverted centers, missing elements or perforation varieties, which it sold for inflated prices".

Tuvalu became a member of the Universal Postal Union on 3 February 1981.

The philatelic business activities are authorised by the Tuvalu Philatelic Bureau Ordinance (1982). Karl Tili was the first Tuvaluan general manager of the Bureau from 1989 to 31 December 2011.

Between 1984 and 1988, stamps were issued for the individual islands – Funafuti, Nanumaga, Nanumea, Niutao, Nui, Nukufetau, Nukulaelae, Vaitupu.

In 2013, the Tuvalu government was proposing to merge the Bureau with the Tuvalu Post Office, which is regulated by the Tuvalu Post Office Act 1977. The Tuvalu Post Office is not separately constituted and is a government department.

== Addresses in Tuvalu ==
Addressing in Tuvalu has been virtually non-existent. As at 2018, fewer than 10 streets in the capital Funafuti were named, and only 100 homes and 10 businesses had a postal address. Most people had to travel to send or retrieve mail, and some did not have access to postal services at all. In 2018, Tuvalu Post, the country’s official postal operator, made what3words a national standard for addresses, enabling home deliveries for the first time.

== See also ==
- Clive Feigenbaum
- Postage stamps and postal history of the Gilbert and Ellice Islands
- Postage stamps and postal history of Kiribati
