= National Adaptation Programme of Action =

Climate change adaptation plan

A National Adaptation Programme of Action (NAPA) is a type of plan submitted to the United Nations Framework Convention on Climate Change (UNFCCC) by least developed countries, to describe the country's perception of its most "urgent and immediate needs to adapt to climate change". NAPAs are not supposed to include original research, but use existing information and include profiles of priority projects that are intended to address those needs that have been identified.

The UNFCCC maintains a database of NAPAs, and of country priorities that have been identified within NAPAs. As of November 2011, it contained reports from 46 LDCs.

The Least Developed Countries Fund (LDCF) was established to finance the preparation of NAPAs and to implement the projects that they propose. The LDCF currently has resources of at least US$415 million, of which US$177 million has been approved for 47 projects, attracting more than US$550 million in co-financing in the process.

== Details ==
NAPAs are intended to provide LDCs with an opportunity to identify their "urgent and immediate needs" for adapting to climate change. As part of the NAPA process, LDC government ministries, typically assisted by development agencies, assess their countries' vulnerability to climate change and extreme weather events. LDCs then develop a prioritized list of adaptation projects that will help the country cope with the adverse effects of climate change. LDCs who submit NAPAs to the UNFCCC then become eligible for funding through the LDCF for NAPA projects. The LDCF was designed through the UNFCCC specifically to assist least developed countries, which are particularly vulnerable to the effects of climate change. To date, forty five LDCs have written and submitted NAPAs to the UNFCCC, with Nepal as the latest country to submit its NAPA in November 2010. Three more countries (Angola, Myanmar, and Timor Leste) are scheduled to complete their NAPAs by the end of 2011.

=== Bangladesh ===
The Bangladesh NAPA proposes a range of priority adaptation projects with a focus on building the country's resilience to the impacts of climate change. These projects are designed to be implemented over the short to medium term, with a view to protecting vulnerable communities and ecosystems in Bangladesh from the impacts of climate change. Some of the key adaptation priorities identified in the Bangladesh NAPA include:

1. Agriculture: The NAPA identifies the need to improve irrigation systems, promote drought-resistant crops, and introduce new agricultural technologies to help farmers cope with the impacts of climate change.
2. Water resources: The NAPA identifies the need to build small-scale water storage facilities, improve water management practices, and protect water sources from contamination.
3. Health: The NAPA identifies the need to improve disease surveillance systems, strengthen health infrastructure, and promote public awareness about the health impacts of climate change.
4. Coastal zones: The NAPA identifies the need to build coastal embankments, improve early warning systems for cyclones and storm surges, and promote alternative livelihoods for coastal communities.
5. Infrastructure: The NAPA identifies the need to improve the resilience of infrastructure to the impacts of climate change, such as by building flood shelters and strengthening transportation networks.

=== Cambodia ===
The National Adaptation Programme of Action (NAPA) in Cambodia was developed to address the country's urgent and immediate needs for adapting to the impacts of climate change. Cambodia is highly vulnerable to the impacts of climate change, including increased frequency and intensity of floods and droughts, as well as the potential loss of agricultural productivity and fisheries. The projects are designed to be implemented over the short to medium term, with a view to protecting vulnerable communities and ecosystems in Cambodia from the impacts of climate change.

== See also ==
- Local Adaptation Plans of Action
- Climate change adaptation
