= Local Adaptation Plans of Action =

Local Adaptation Plans of Action (LAPAs) are community-driven plans that aim to help local governments and communities build resilience to the impacts of climate change. LAPAs are typically developed in regions or communities that are particularly vulnerable to the effects of climate change, such as areas prone to flooding, droughts, or extreme weather events.

The LAPA process typically involves a participatory approach, where local stakeholders and community members are engaged in identifying and prioritizing climate risks and vulnerabilities. Based on this information, adaptation options and strategies are identified, and a plan is developed to implement these actions.

LAPAs may include a range of adaptation measures, such as improving water management systems, enhancing early warning systems for natural disasters, promoting the use of climate-resilient crop varieties, or building infrastructure to protect against sea-level rise. The LAPA process is often facilitated by national or international organizations, and may be supported by funding from international climate change adaptation funds.

LAPAs contrast with National Adaptation Programme of Action (NAPAs) in their bottom-up, local approach, but in some cases are funded under the similar development assistance schemes. LAPAs are often prepared at local government level, although community-based LAPAs are also in place. The practice was initiated in Nepal under the guidance of the Ministry of Population and Environment, the national focal point to United Nations Framework Convention on Climate Change.

== Nepal ==
The LAPA process in Nepal is designed to be participatory and community-driven, with the involvement of local stakeholders, including women, youth, and marginalized groups, in identifying climate risks and vulnerabilities, and developing adaptation measures. The LAPA process includes several stages, including vulnerability and risk assessment, identification of adaptation options, and prioritization of actions.

The LAPA process in Nepal has been supported by various national and international organizations, including the United Nations Development Programme (UNDP), the World Bank, and the Global Environment Facility (GEF). These organizations have provided technical and financial support for the development and implementation of LAPAs, as well as capacity building for local stakeholders.

One example of a successful LAPA in Nepal is the one developed in the Kailali district, which is highly vulnerable to floods and landslides. The LAPA process in Kailali involved the participation of more than 1,000 community members, including women and marginalized groups, in identifying and prioritizing adaptation measures, such as building river embankments, constructing check dams, and improving early warning systems for floods.
