= Tuvalu Ship Registry =

The flag of Tuvalu.

The Tuvalu Ship Registry is the body appointed by the government of Tuvalu to register ships under the Tuvaluan flag. It is an open registry, which means ships can be foreign-owned and -controlled.

== History ==
In 2004, the Parliament of Tuvalu passed the Merchant Shipping (Registration of Foreign Vessels) Regulations, paving the way for the establishment of the ship registry. Sovereign Venture, a company based in Singapore, was designated Tuvalu's Foreign Ship Administrator, and the registry was opened in May 2004, based in Singapore. In 2014, Sovereign Ventures' contract expired, and its subsidiary, Competent Maritime Administration, signed a ten-year contract in April of that year as its replacement.

In an attempt to circumvent an impending European boycott of Iranian oil exports over Iran's nuclear policy, eleven Iranian oil tankers switched to Tuvaluan registry in 2012. Another report stated that 22 tankers switched from Maltan registry. However, the Government of Tuvalu took swift action to instruct the Tuvalu Ship Registry to de-register all possible Iranian-linked vessels on 10 August 2012, which was completed by 21 September.

== Functions ==
The responsibilities of the registry include:

- the registration and licensing of ships
- the certification of seafarers
- the inspection of vessels to ensure compliance with safety and environmental standards
- the recording and discharge of mortgages

== Vessels registered ==
The ships in the registry increased, from 210 in 2011 to 335 in 2026, with its biggest jump in that period being the 18.8% increase from 2025 (282) to 2026. This total places it at 58th out of 198 countries. As of 2026, this consisted of 39 general cargo ships, 15 bulk carriers, 15 oil tankers, 3 container ships and 263 other types.
