= Tuvalu Post Office Act 1977 =

Law of Tuvalu

The Tuvalu Post Office Act 1977, effective from 4 May 1977, is the act of the Tuvalu Government to "reform the law relating to the establishment and regulation of Post Office and the conveyance of mails" in Tuvalu. The act was revised in 2008 and is extended by Post Office Regulations of 1978, also revised 2008, and Money Order Regulations of 2008.

As a small nation, the Post Office of Tuvalu is not separately constituted and is a department of central government.
