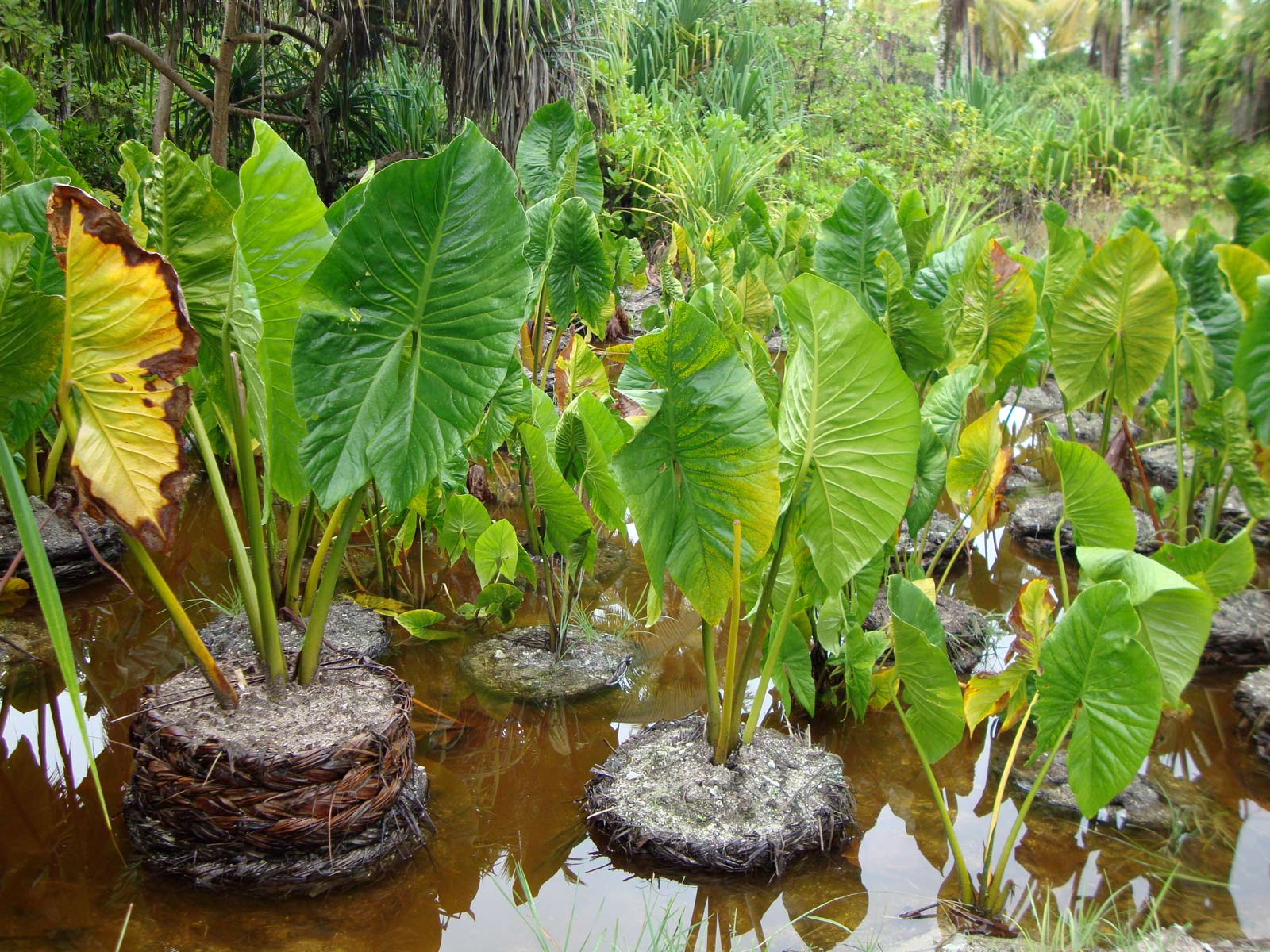
- Babai cultivation in Butaritari, Kiribati

Scientific classification
- Kingdom: Plantae
- Clade: Tracheophytes
- Clade: Angiosperms
- Clade: Monocots
- Order: Alismatales
- Family: Araceae
- Genus: Cyrtosperma
- Species: C. merkusii

Binomial name
- Cyrtosperma merkusii (Hassk.) Schott

Synonyms
- Cyrtosperma chamissonis (Schott) Merr.; Cyrtosperma edule Schott; Cyrtosperma lasioides Griff.

= Cyrtosperma merkusii =

Species of flowering plant

Cyrtosperma merkusii or giant swamp taro, is a crop grown throughout Oceania and into South and Southeast Asia. It is a riverine and "swamp crop" similar to taro, but "with bigger leaves and larger, coarser roots." There are no demonstrably wild populations today, but it is believed to be native to Indonesia. It is known as puraka in Cook Islands, lak in Yap (Federated States of Micronesia), babai in Kiribati, iaraj in the Marshall Islands, brak in Palau, babaʻ in the Marianas Islands, pula’a in Samoa, via kana, Pulaka in Lau, Lovo in Fiji, pulaka in Tokelau and Tuvalu, mwahng in Pohnpei, pasruk in Kosrae, simiden in Chuuk, swam taro in Papua New Guinea, 'kakake' in Solomon Islands, navia in Vanuatu and galyang or palawan in the Philippines.

The same species is also known by the names Cyrtosperma lasioides, Cyrtosperma chamissonis and Cyrtosperma edule.

In the harsh atoll environments of the Central Pacific, especially Tuvalu and Kiribati, swamp taro is an important source of carbohydrates in a diet dominated by fish and coconut. Its cultivation is difficult and time-consuming, and the plant has deep cultural as well as practical significance. The roots need to be cooked for hours to reduce toxicity in the corms, but are rich in nutrients, especially calcium. The cultivation of Pulaka in Tuvalu, and babai in Kiribati, is an important cultural and culinary tradition, now under threat from rising sea level and displacement from the growing use of imported food products.

In Nepal, Giant Swamp Taro is called mane and grows in the tropical and sub tropical forests along stream banks. It is gathered in January–February and all plant parts (leaf, stem, rhizomes) are savored after being boiled and roasted. The stem requires prolonged boiling and the water is replaced once to remove irritating chemicals. If cooked carefully, the rhizomes taste like taro and the leaves like spinach. But without careful washing, the food causes an unpleasant tingling or scratchy sensation.

== Species ==
Giant swamp taro is the largest of the root crop plants known collectively as Taro, which are cultivated throughout Southeast Asia and the Pacific. Although outwardly similar to Colocasia esculenta, the most widely cultivated taro, it belongs to a different genus. The plant may reach heights of 4–6 metres, with leaves and roots much larger than Colocasia esculenta. The sagittate leaves are up to 6 ft 7 in (2.01 m) long by up to four feet (120 cm) in width, borne atop petioles or stalks up to 19 ft 6 in (5.94 m) in length and four inches (10 cm) wide. It is relatively resistant to disease and pests but is susceptible to taro beetle (Papuana). The corm, which can reach weights of 80 kg or even 220 pounds (100 kg) with a diameter of up to 39 inches (0.99 meters) and equally long. is starchy and cream or pink in colour, with a taste similar to sweet potato, though it is drier in texture.

== Cultivation ==
Giant swamp taro is not suitable for growing in upland or rainfed conditions; it has adapted to growth within fresh water and coastal swamps. It exhibits some shade tolerance and is considered mildly tolerant of saline growing conditions compared to other taro species; that is, it can be grown in mildly brackish water. It is a slow growing crop which can take up to 15 years to mature.

Giant swamp taro is nearly the only carbohydrate crop that can be cultivated on low-lying coral atolls, where it is grown in purpose-built swamp pits dug to below the level of the freshwater lens. The cultivation of Pulaka in Tuvalu, and of babai in Kiribati, has deep cultural significance. In these harsh environments, its cultivation is increasingly threatened by rising sea levels caused by global warming: the plant does not thrive in brackish water, which rots the roots, turns the leaves yellow, and stunts the plant's growth. Climate change is affecting its cultivation in two ways; more frequent droughts increase the salinity of the freshwater lens, and more extreme high tides and coastal erosion lead to saltwater intrusions where seawater enters the cultivation pits.

In the Philippines, giant swamp taro is known as palawan (or palauan), palaw (or palau), or payaw (also applied to Homalomena philippinensis). It is commonly cultivated and harvested for their corms in the Visayas Islands and Mindanao (especially in Siargao and northeastern Mindanao). They are usually prepared in the same way as other taro dishes in the Philippines. They are also used as sweet fillings for pastries like hopia.

== Preparation ==
Giant swamp taro contains toxins which must be removed by long cooking. It may be field stored in the ground for very long periods – up to 30 years or more – and accordingly has traditionally been an important emergency crop in times of natural disaster and food scarcity. The cooked corms can be dried in the sun and stored for later use. Different methods of preparation are used for pulaka in Tuvalu, and babai in Kiribati.

In the Philippines where this grows in swamps or marshes, the corms are harvested for food. It is left to grow for years and signs that it has enough corms when the mother stems have fewer leaves and it has reached a sizable size with tubers. The harvested corms are cooked for food which is starchy. Unlike taro and eddo, it is not purposely cultivated for its starchy corm for food. It usually grows in the wild in swampy areas and marshes. It is called Palawan by Waray people where it is most popular as an edible food.

== See also ==
- Pulaka
- Taro
