= Pulaka =

Crop grown in Tuvalu

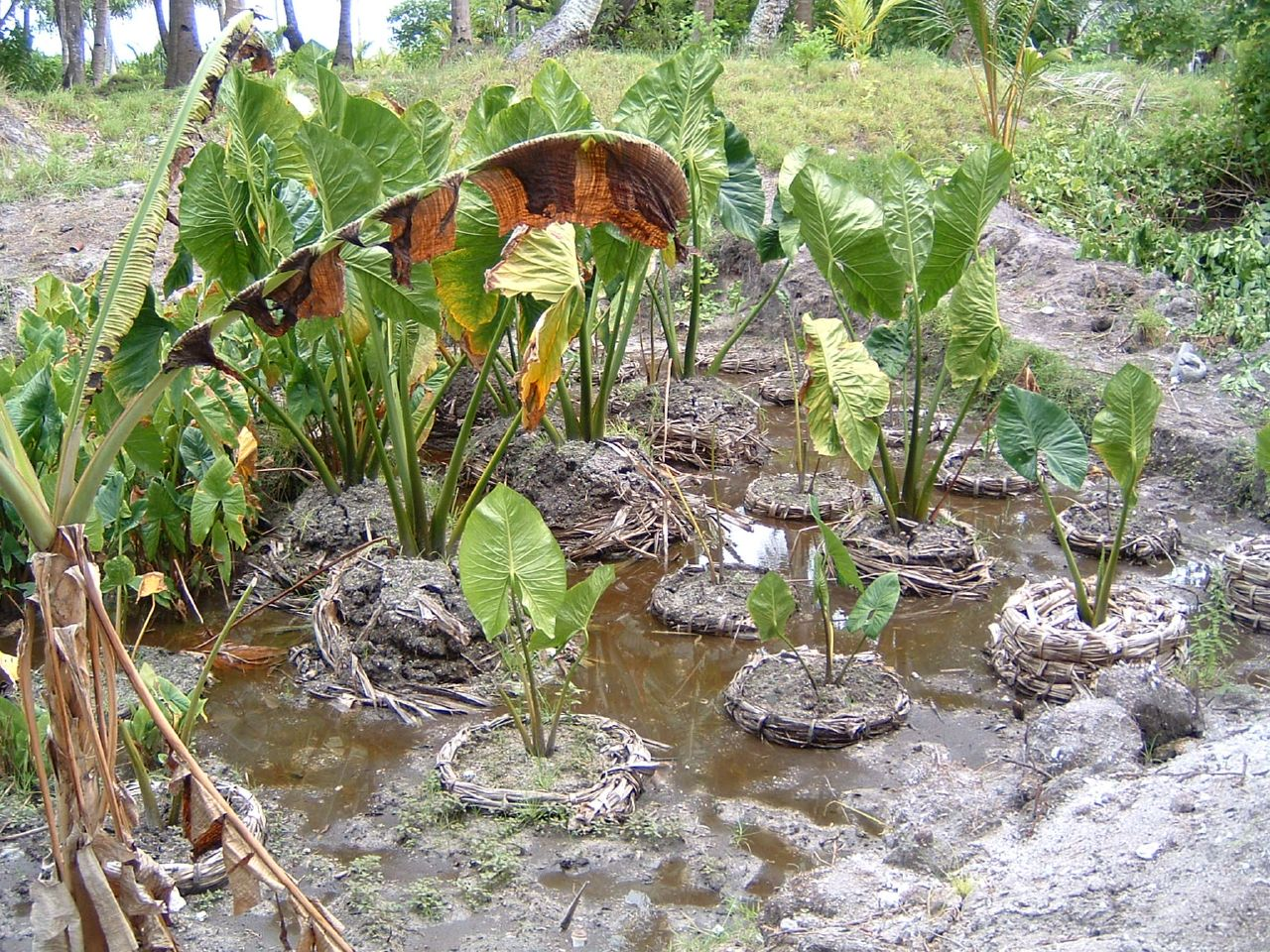
A pit that Pulaka is grown in.

Pulaka, Cyrtosperma merkusii, or swamp taro, is a crop grown mainly in Tuvalu and an important source of carbohydrates for the area's inhabitants. It is a "swamp crop" similar to taro, but "with bigger leaves and larger, coarser roots." The same plant is known as pulaka in Niue, babai in Kiribati, puraka in Cook Islands, pula’a in Samoa, via, via kana or via kau in Fiji, pulaka in Tokelau, simiden in Chuuk, swam taro in Papua New Guinea, and navia in Vanuatu.

Pulaka roots need to be cooked for hours to reduce toxicity in the corms, but are rich in nutrients, especially calcium. Pulaka is an important part of Tuvalu cultural and culinary tradition, now under threat from rising sea level and displacement from the growing use of imported food products.

== Cultivation ==
The crop is grown in pits dug into the limestone atoll and is fertilized by adding leaves from different plants. The plants derive water from the freshwater lens found a few meters below the atoll. For this reason the cultivation of pulaka is threatened by rising sea levels caused by global warming: the plant does not thrive in the salt water which seeps into the pits: it rots the roots, turns the leaves yellow, and stunts the plant's growth. These saltwater intrusions occur more often now that the high tides have become higher, and more frequently flood the islands. To alleviate the problem of saltwater pollution, some islanders have begun to line the pits, side and bottom, with cement.

== Preparation and preservation ==
Pulaka makes up the bulk of the islanders' traditional diet; it is usually supplemented by fish. Since the unprocessed corms are toxic, they must always be cooked, usually in an earth oven. Many of the recipes call for the addition of coconut cream or toddy, or both. On Niutao, coconut cream (lolo) is poured over beaten pulp of pulaka, to make a dish called tulolo. A similar dish on Nukufetau, with halved corms, is called tulolo pulaka; with beaten corms the dish is called fakapapa. Fekei is made on all the islands, and consists of pulaka which is grated (typically this is done by the women) with the aid of limestone with holes drilled in it. The resulting pulp is wrapped in pulaka leaves and steamed, and mixed with coconut cream.

Preserving any food on the islands is difficult because of the hot climate. Pulaka is usually preserved by burying it in the ground, and it will keep up to three months. Cooks take baked pulaka corms and slice them to dry them in the sun; after six days of drying, the slices (pulaka valuvalu) are packed in coconut containers and hung from roof beams, and will keep up to seven years. The dried substance can be cooked in coconut cream and water to create a dish called likoliko. On Nukufetao, puatolo is a dish made from grated pulaka and toddy, baked in the oven; when dried in the sun it will keep for three months.

== Cultural significance ==
The pits are dug and maintained by individual families over generations and have great cultural and personal significance: "The ownership and cultivation of the pulaka pits is an important part of family identity, cultural pride and survival. Encroachment of the salt water into the pulaka pit threatens the future of the people of Tuvalu." In addition, the secrets of producing the crop are often transferred from father to son, and when a father teaches his son how to plant pulaka, he is "practicing how to live like a man."

Besides rising saltwater levels, "changing lifestyles and eating habits" also threaten the cultivation of the crop, a process that began during and after World War II, when American occupying troops supplied the islands with imported foods and many pits were no longer maintained. Imported foods are often high in sugar, leading also to an increase in the need for dental care and diabetes.
