= Lens (hydrology) =

Layer of fresh groundwater

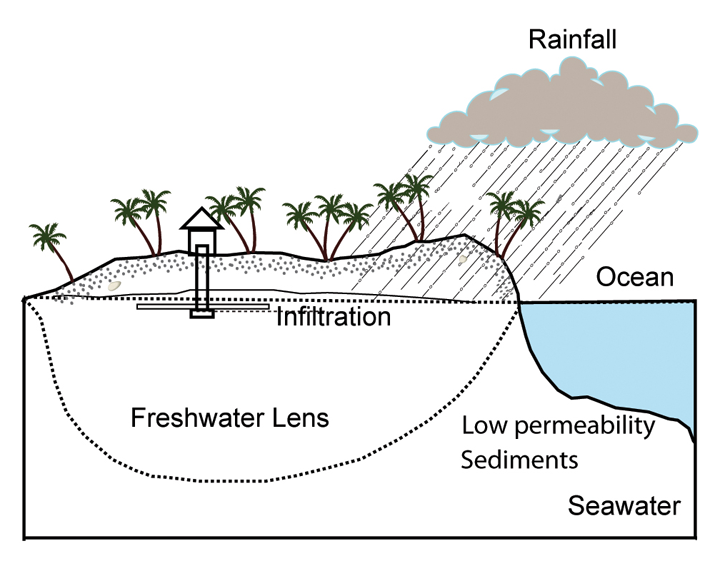
A freshwater lens on an island.

In hydrology, a lens, also called freshwater lens or Ghyben-Herzberg lens, is a convex layer of fresh groundwater that floats above the denser saltwater and is usually found on small coral or limestone islands and atolls. This aquifer of fresh water is recharged through precipitation that infiltrates the top layer of soil and percolates downward until it reaches the saturated zone. The recharge rate of the lens can be summarized by the following equation:

$$R = p-ET$$

Where $R$ is the recharge rate in meters, $p$ is precipitation (m), and $ET$ is evapotranspiration (m) of water. With higher amounts of recharge, the hydraulic head is increased, and a thick freshwater lens is maintained through the dry season. Lower rates of precipitation or higher rates of interception and evapotranspiration will decrease the hydraulic head, resulting in a thin lens.

== Models of freshwater lenses ==
=== Algebraic model ===
An algebraic model for estimating the thickness of a freshwater lens was developed using groundwater simulations by Bailey et al. 2008. This equation relates lens thickness to geologic and climatic factors such as island geometry, geologic composition, and recharge rate, among others. The equation is summarized below:

$$Z_{max} =\frac{Y+ (Z_{td} - Y)R}{B+R} \cdot KCT_{r,s,w,y,m}$$

Where $Z_{max}$ = maximum depth of the lens, $R$ = annual recharge rate (m), $Y$ and $B$ = parameters depending on the width of the island, $Z_{td}$ = depth to Thurber Discontinuity (the transition between the upper and lower aquifers), $K$ = hydraulic conductivity of the upper aquifer, $C$ = confining reef plate parameter, and $T$ = time parameter depicting long-term rainfall patterns with the subscripts representing different aspects of this such as region, weather pattern, etc.

=== Classic Badon Ghyben-Herzberg lens ===
Many freshwater aquifers on atolls and small rounded islands take on the form of a Badon Ghyben-Herzberg lens. This relationship is described in the equation below:

$$H = h\cdot\frac{P_f}{P_s-P_f}$$

Where $H$ = the depth of the lens below sea level, $P_f$ = the density of the freshwater aquifer, $P_s$= density of saltwater, and $h$ = thickness of lens above sea level.

== Effects of drought ==
Freshwater lenses rely on seasonal rainfall to recharge the underground aquifer and can drastically change in thickness following drought or heavy rainfall. A USGS report following the 1997/1998 drought in the Marshall Islands observed a noticeable decline in the thickness of the lens. After the reservoirs of the public rainfall catchment system were rapidly depleted following several months of inadequate precipitation, the islands' population began increasing the rate of groundwater pumping to the point that groundwater supplied up to 90% of the island's drinking water during the drought.

A network of 36 monitoring wells at 11 sites was installed around the island to measure the amount of water depleted from the aquifer. By the end of the drought in June 1998, the maximum thickness of the freshwater lens was about 45 feet (14 m) in some wells, while one site measured a thickness as low as 18 feet (5.5 m). Following the resumption of the rainy season, the thickness of the lens increased by up to 8 feet (2.4 m) in some areas, indicating that the recharge rate of freshwater lenses on atolls and small islands responds rapidly to changes in precipitation and groundwater pumping rate.

== Effects of sea level rise ==
Many of the atolls that support freshwater lenses are only a few meters above sea level and as such they are at risk of inundation due to sea level rise. However, an arguably more pressing issue facing these small islands is the intrusion of saltwater on the freshwater aquifer. As more and more of the potable groundwater is salinized, the populations of these islands may see a substantial reduction in available water resources. Smaller islands are at a far greater risk of extensive saltwater intrusion due to a non-linear relationship between island width and thickness of the freshwater lens.

A 40 cm rise in sea level can have a drastic effect on the shape and thickness of the freshwater lens, reducing its size by up to 50% and encouraging the formation of brackish zones. Saline plumes can form at the bottom of the freshwater aquifer when the lens thickness is compromised by drought and saltwater intrusion. Even after a full year of groundwater recharge, the saline plume may not completely dissipate. Sea level rise will likely lead to sustained and possibly irreparable damage to freshwater lenses due to an increase in cyclone-generated wave washover, rendering many islands uninhabitable with the loss of potable water.
