= Outline of Tuvalu =

Overview of and topical guide to Tuvalu

The Flag of Tuvalu

The Coat of arms of Tuvalu

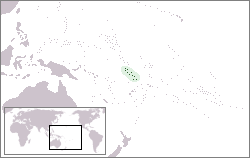
The location of Tuvalu

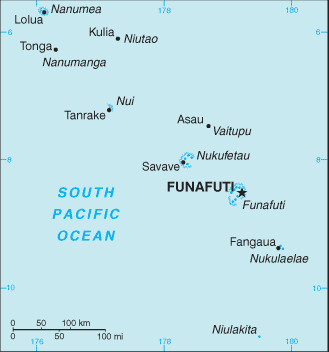
An enlargeable map of Tuvalu

The following outline is provided as an overview of and topical guide to Tuvalu:

Tuvalu (formerly known as the Ellice Islands) – sovereign Polynesian island nation located in the South Pacific Ocean midway between Hawaiʻi and Australia. Its nearest neighbours are Kiribati, Samoa and Fiji. Comprising three reef islands and six true atolls with a gross land area of just 26 square kilometers (10 sq mi) it is the third-least populated independent country in the world, with only the Vatican City and the Republic of Naoero (Nauru), having fewer inhabitants. It is also the second-smallest member by population of the United Nations. In terms of physical land size, Tuvalu is the fourth smallest country in the world, larger only than the Vatican City—0.44 km^{2}; Monaco—1.95 km^{2} and Nauru—21 km^{2}. Tuvalu's Exclusive Economic Zone (EEZ) covers an oceanic area of approximately 900,000 km^{2}.

The first inhabitants of Tuvalu were Polynesians. Therefore, the origins of the people of Tuvalu are addressed in the theories regarding the spread of humans out of Southeast Asia, from Taiwan, via Melanesia and across the Pacific islands to create Polynesia.

Tuvalu was first sighted by Europeans on 16 January 1568 during the voyage of Álvaro de Mendaña de Neira from Spain who is understood to have sighted the island of Nui. Mendaña made contact with the islanders but was unable to land. During Mendaña's second voyage across the Pacific he passed Niulakita on 29 August 1595. Captain John Byron passed through the islands of Tuvalu in 1764 during his circumnavigation of the globe as captain of HMS Dolphin.

Keith S. Chambers and Doug Munro (1980) identify Niutao as the island that Francisco Mourelle de la Rúa sailed past on 5 May 1781, thus solving what Europeans had called The Mystery of Gran Cocal. Mourelle's map and journal named the island El Gran Cocal ('The Great Coconut Plantation'); however, the latitude and longitude was uncertain. Longitude could only be reckoned crudely as accurate chronometers were available until the late 18th century. Visits to the islands became more frequent in the 19th century.

The islands came under Britain's sphere of influence in the late 19th century. The Ellice Islands were administered by Britain as a protectorate under the jurisdiction of the Western Pacific High Commission from 1892 to 1916 and as part of the Gilbert and Ellice Islands Colony from 1916 to 1974. In 1974 the Ellice Islanders voted for separate British dependency status for Tuvalu, separating from the Gilbert Islands which became Kiribati upon independence. Tuvalu became fully independent within The Commonwealth in 1978. On 17 September 2000 Tuvalu became the 189th member of the United Nations.

== General reference ==
- Pronunciation:
- Common English country name: Tuvalu
- Official English country name: Tuvalu
- Common endonym(s):
- Official endonym(s):
- Adjectival(s): Tuvaluan
- Demonym(s): Tuvaluan
- Etymology: From first settlement, eight of the nine islands of Tuvalu were inhabited; thus the name, Tuvalu, means "eight standing together" in Tuvaluan (compare to *walo meaning "eight" in Proto-Austronesian).
- ISO country codes: TV, TUV, 798
- ISO region codes: See ISO 3166-2:TV
- Internet country code top-level domain: .tv

== Geography of Tuvalu ==
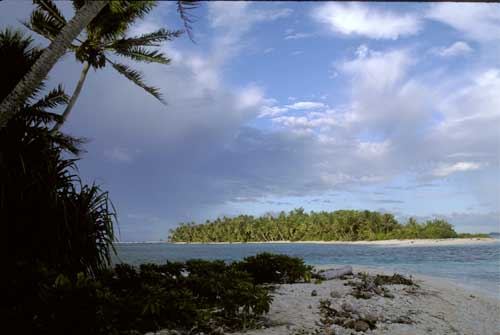
Fualefeke islet, Funafuti atoll

The islands of Tuvalu are spread out between the latitude of 5° to 10° south and longitude of 176° to 180°, west of the International Date Line.

Geographic coordinates: 5°41′S 176°12′E to 10°45′S 179°51′E

- Tuvalu is...
  - a group of islands, comprising...
    - three reef islands
    - six true atolls
  - a country
    - an island country
    - a nation state
    - a Commonwealth realm
- Location:
  - Southern Hemisphere and Eastern Hemisphere
  - Pacific Ocean
    - South Pacific Ocean
      - Oceania
        - Polynesia
  - Time zone: Tuvalu Time (UTC+12)
  - Extreme points of Tuvalu
    - High: unnamed location on Niulakita 4.5 m (15 ft)
    - Low: South Pacific Ocean 0 m
  - Land boundaries: none
  - Coastline: South Pacific Ocean 24 km
- Population of Tuvalu: The 2022 census determined that Tuvalu had a population of 10,643, - 194th most populous country
- Area of Tuvalu: 26 km^{2}
- Atlas of Tuvalu

=== Environment of Tuvalu ===
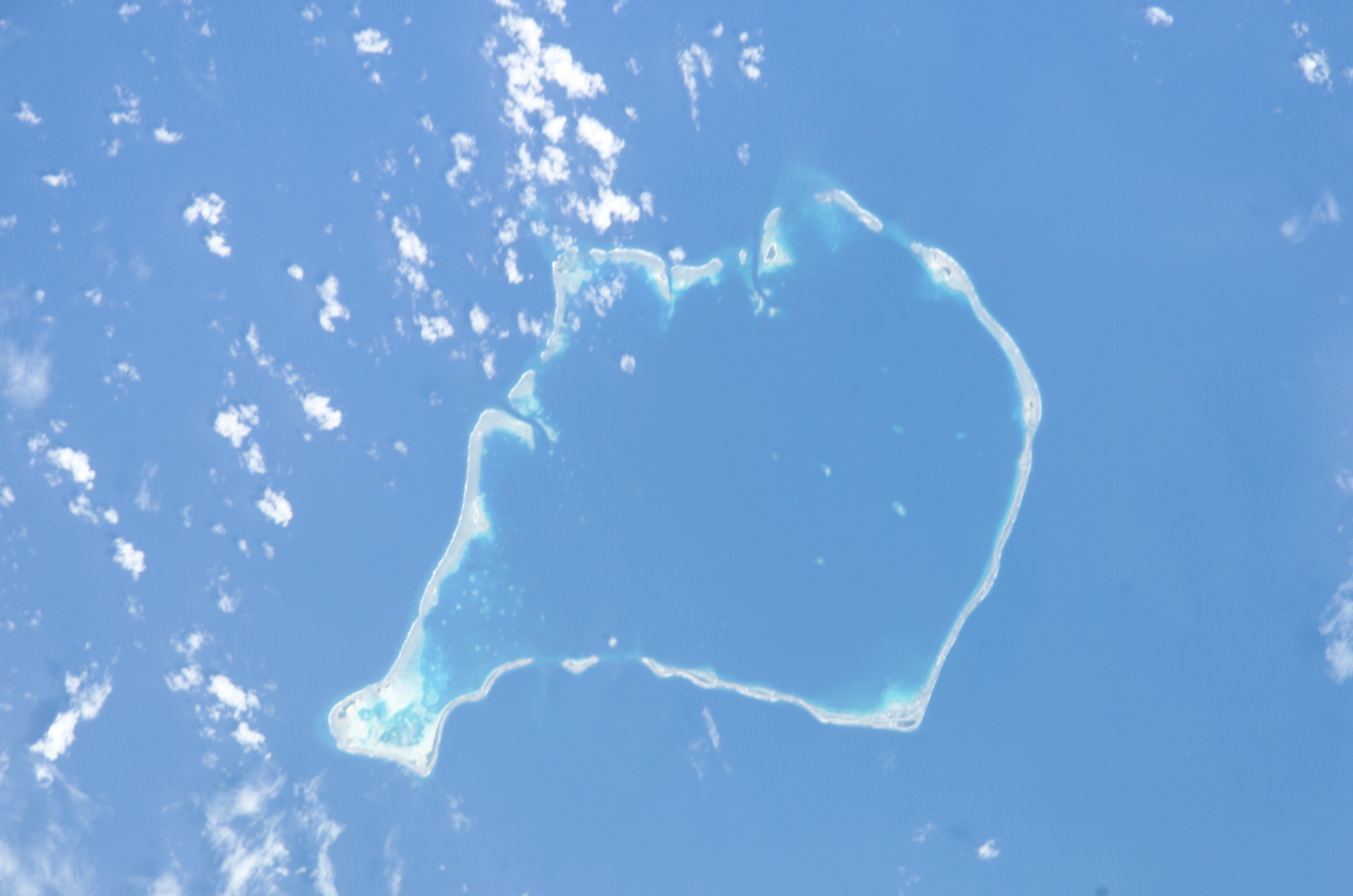
An enlargeable satellite image of the island of Funafuti in Tuvalu

- Climate of Tuvalu
  - Tuvalu Meteorological Service
- Geology of Tuvalu
- Protected areas of Tuvalu
  - Funafuti Conservation Area
- Fauna of Tuvalu
  - Birds of Tuvalu
  - Butterflies of Tuvalu
  - Mammals of Tuvalu
- Flora of Tuvalu
  - Native broadleaf forest

==== Natural geographic features of Tuvalu ====
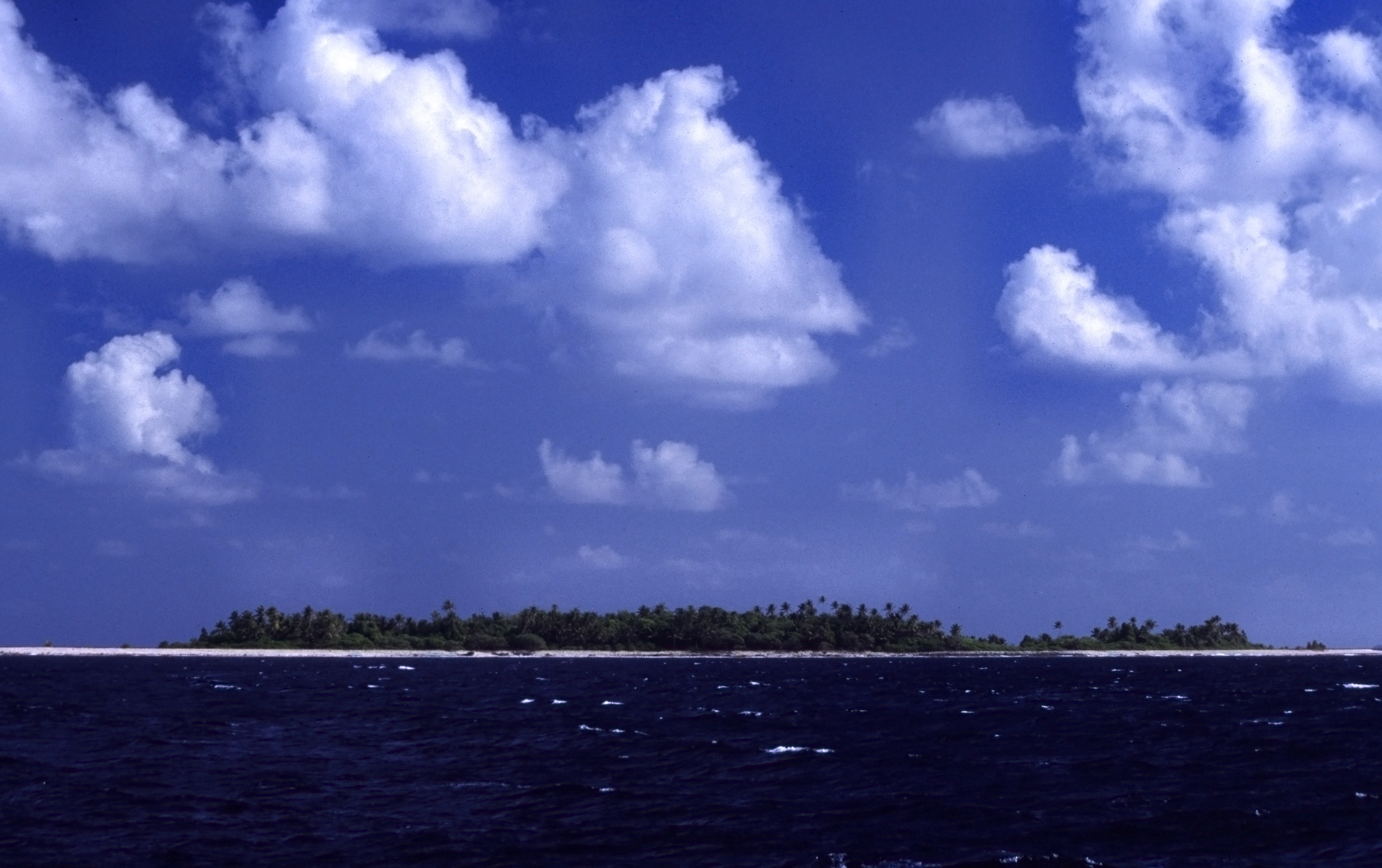
Lat. and Long. 8.31°S 179.13°E (Funafuti)

Tuvalu consists of three reef islands and six true atolls, whose highest point above the sea is five metres.

- Islands of Tuvalu
- Coral reefs of Tuvalu
- Lakes of Tuvalu: landlocked lagoons in Nanumaga and Niutao
- Rivers of Tuvalu: none
- World Heritage Sites in Tuvalu: none

=== Regions of Tuvalu ===
Local government districts consisting of more than one islet:

- Funafuti
- Nanumea
- Nui
- Nukufetau
- Nukulaelae
- Vaitupu

Local government districts consisting of only one island:

- Nanumanga
- Niulakita
- Niutao

==== Ecoregions of Tuvalu ====
Funafuti Conservation Area

=== Demography of Tuvalu ===
Demographics of Tuvalu

== Government and politics of Tuvalu ==
Politics of Tuvalu

- Form of government: parliamentary monarchy (Commonwealth realm)
  - Constitution of Tuvalu
- Capital of Tuvalu: Funafuti
- Elections in Tuvalu
- Political parties in Tuvalu: none

=== Branches of the government of Tuvalu ===
Government of Tuvalu

==== Executive branch of the government of Tuvalu ====
- Head of state: King of Tuvalu, Charles III
  - Governor-General of Tuvalu, Temukisa Auina Penehuro Hauma
- Head of government: Prime Minister of Tuvalu, Feleti Teo
- Cabinet of Tuvalu

==== Legislative branch of the government of Tuvalu ====
- Parliament of Tuvalu (unicameral)

==== Judicial branch of the government of Tuvalu ====
- Judiciary
  - High Court of Tuvalu
  - Court of Appeal of Tuvalu

=== Foreign relations of Tuvalu ===
Foreign relations of Tuvalu

- Diplomatic missions in Tuvalu
- Diplomatic missions of Tuvalu

==== International organization membership ====
Tuvalu is a member of:

- African, Caribbean, and Pacific Group of States (ACP)
- Asian Development Bank (ADB)
- Commonwealth of Nations
- Food and Agriculture Organization (FAO)
- International Federation of Red Cross and Red Crescent Societies (IFRCS) (observer)
- International Maritime Organization (IMO)
- International Olympic Committee (IOC)
- International Telecommunication Union (ITU)
- Organisation for the Prohibition of Chemical Weapons (OPCW)
- Pacific Islands Forum (PIF)
- Secretariat of the Pacific Community (SPC)
- South Pacific Regional Trade and Economic Cooperation Agreement (Sparteca)
- United Nations (UN)
- United Nations Conference on Trade and Development (UNCTAD)
- United Nations Educational, Scientific, and Cultural Organization (UNESCO)
- Universal Postal Union (UPU)
- World Health Organization (WHO)

=== Law and order in Tuvalu ===
Constitution of Tuvalu

- Crime in Tuvalu
- Human Rights in Tuvalu
  - LGBT rights in Tuvalu
  - Women in Tuvalu
  - Religion in Tuvalu
  - Climate change in Tuvalu
- Law enforcement in Tuvalu

=== Military of Tuvalu ===
Military of Tuvalu

There is no military in Tuvalu. Its national police force, the Tuvalu Police Force headquartered in Funafuti, includes a maritime surveillance unit, customs, prisons and immigration.

=== Local government in Tuvalu ===
- Local government

== History of Tuvalu ==
- Timeline of the history of Tuvalu
- Tuvaluan mythology

== Culture of Tuvalu ==
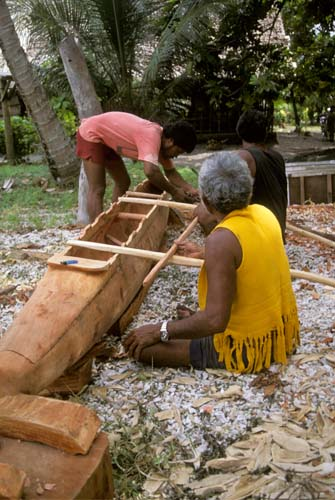
Canoe carving on Nanumea

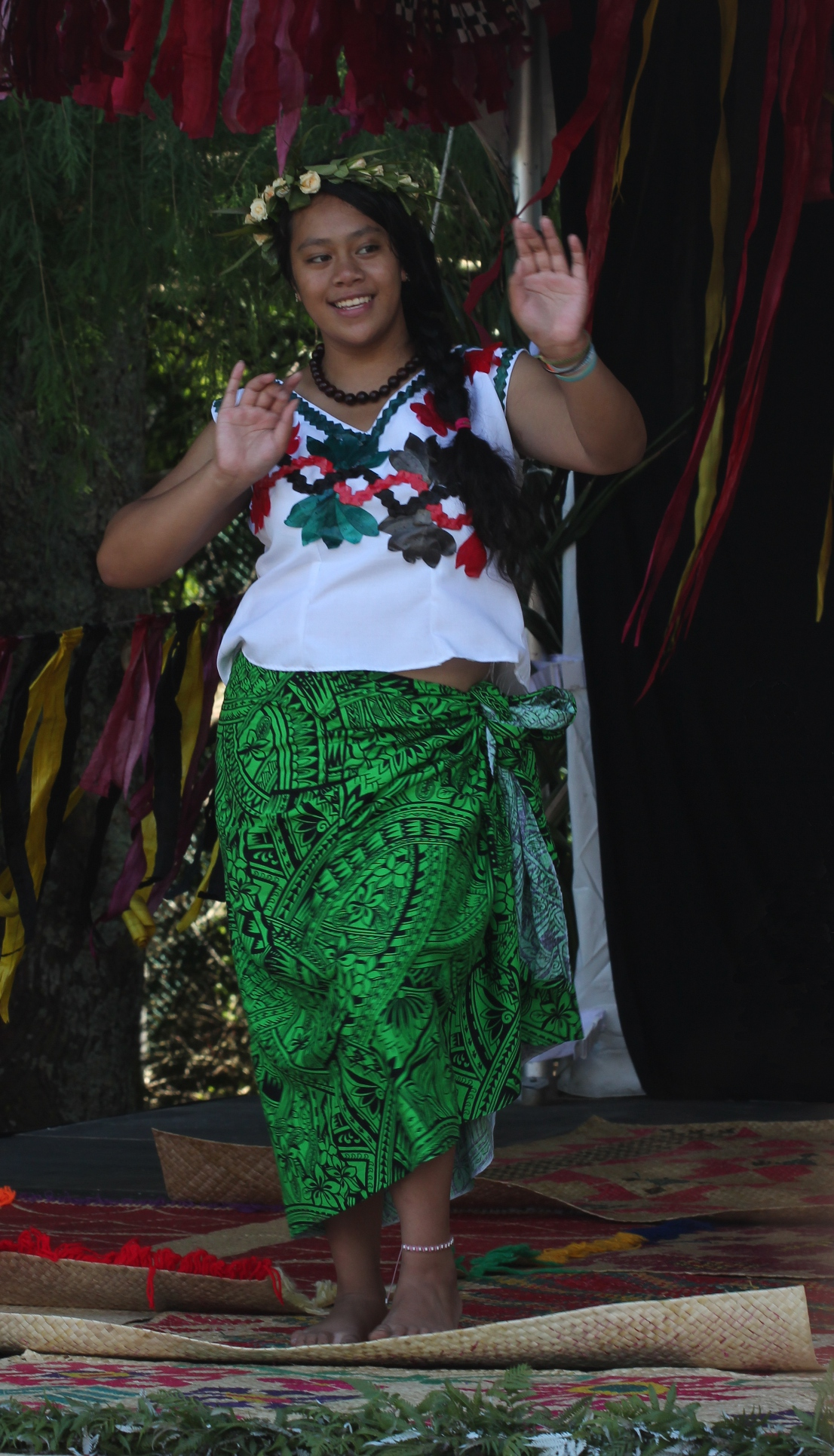
A Tuvaluan dancer at Auckland's Pasifika Festival

- Architecture of Tuvalu
- Cuisine of Tuvalu
- Public holidays in Tuvalu
- Tuvaluan language
- Tuvaluan mythology
- National symbols of Tuvalu
  - Coat of arms of Tuvalu
  - Flag of Tuvalu
  - National anthem of Tuvalu
- People of Tuvalu
- Records of Tuvalu: Tuvalu National Library and Archives
- Religion in Tuvalu
  - Christianity in Tuvalu: Church of Tuvalu
  - Islam in Tuvalu
- World Heritage Sites in Tuvalu: None

=== Art in Tuvalu ===
- Music of Tuvalu

=== Sports in Tuvalu ===
- Football in Tuvalu
- Tuvalu at the Olympics
- Tuvalu at the Pacific Games
- Tuvalu at the Commonwealth Games
  - Tuvaluan records in athletics

== Economy and infrastructure of Tuvalu ==
- Economic rank, by nominal GDP (2007): 190th (one hundred and ninetieth)
- Agriculture in Tuvalu
- Financial institutions in Tuvalu
  - National Bank of Tuvalu
  - Tuvalu Trust Fund
- Communications
  - Tuvalu Telecommunications Corporation
  - Tuvalu Media Corporation
- Public sector enterprises of Tuvalu
  - Tuvalu Maritime Training Institute
  - Tuvalu Philatelic Bureau
  - Vaiaku Lagi Hotel
- Private sector enterprises of Tuvalu
- Currency of Tuvalu: Tuvaluan dollar/Australian dollar
  - ISO 4217: TVD/AUD
- Energy in Tuvalu
  - Renewable energy in Tuvalu
- Tourism in Tuvalu
  - Visa policy of Tuvalu
- Transport in Tuvalu

== Education in Tuvalu ==
- History of education in Tuvalu
  - Motufoua Secondary School
  - Fetuvalu Secondary School
  - Tuvalu Maritime Training Institute

== Infrastructure of Tuvalu ==
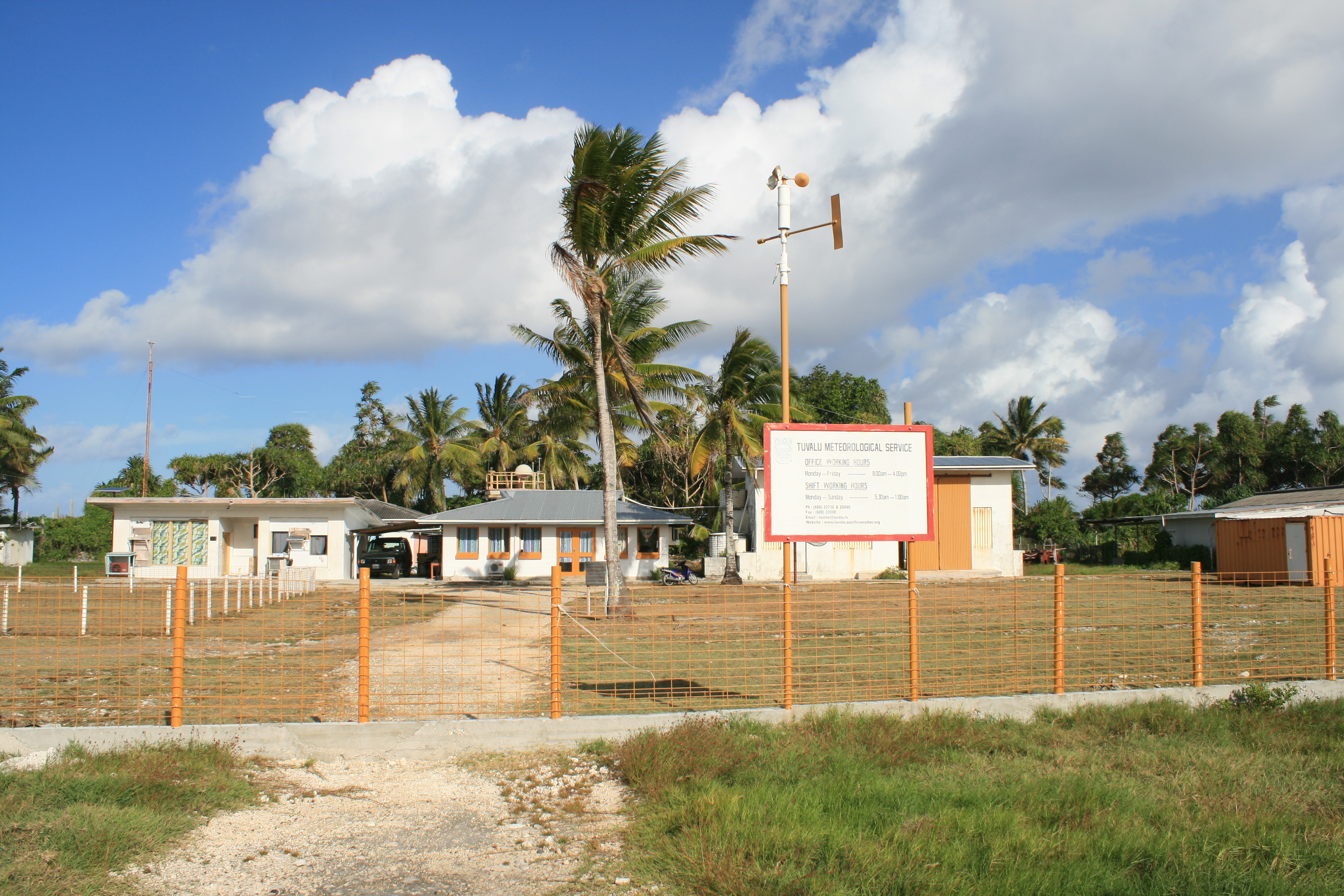
Tuvalu Meteorological Service, Fongafale, Funafuti atoll

- Health in Tuvalu
  - Princess Margaret Hospital
- Transportation in Tuvalu
  - Funafuti International Airport
  - Shipping in Tuvalu
  - Roads in Tuvalu
- Water supply and sanitation in Tuvalu

== Filmography ==
Documentary films about Tuvalu:

- Tu Toko Tasi (Stand by Yourself) (2000) Conrad Mill, a Secretariat of the Pacific Community (SPC) production.
- Paradise Domain – Tuvalu (Director: Joost De Haas, Bullfrog Films/TVE 2001) 25:52 minutes - YouTube video.
- Tuvalu island tales (A Tale of two Islands) (Director: Michel Lippitsch) 34 minutes - YouTube video.
- The Disappearing of Tuvalu: Trouble in Paradise (2004) by Christopher Horner and Gilliane Le Gallic.
- Paradise Drowned: Tuvalu, the Disappearing Nation (2004) Written and produced by Wayne Tourell. Directed by Mike O'Connor, Savana Jones-Middleton and Wayne Tourell.
- Going Under (2004) by Franny Armstrong, Spanner Films.
- Before the Flood: Tuvalu (2005) by Paul Lindsay (Storyville/BBC Four).
- Time and Tide (2005) by Julie Bayer and Josh Salzman, Wavecrest Films
- Tuvalu: That Sinking Feeling (2005) by Elizabeth Pollock from PBS Rough Cut
- Atlantis Approaching (2006) by Elizabeth Pollock, Blue Marble Productions
- King Tide | The Sinking of Tuvalu (2007) by Juriaan Booij.
- Tuvalu (Director: Aaron Smith, ‘Hungry Beast’ program, ABC June 2011) 6:40 minutes - YouTube video
- Tuvalu: Renewable Energy in the Pacific Islands Series (2012) Global Environment Facility (GEF), United Nations Development Programme (UNDP) and Secretariat of the Pacific Regional Environment Programme (SPREP) 10 minutes – YouTube video.
- Mission Tuvalu (Missie Tuvalu) (2013) feature documentary directed by Jeroen van den Kroonenberg.
- ThuleTuvalu (2014) by Matthias von Gunten, HesseGreutert Film/OdysseyFilm.
- Inside Tuvalu: A country being lost to rising sea level - documentary (2023) - YouTube video

== Bibliography ==
- Bibliography of Tuvalu

== See also ==
- List of international rankings
- Member state of the Commonwealth of Nations
- Member state of the United Nations
- Monarchy of Tuvalu
- Outline of geography
- Outline of Oceania
