= Protestantism in Tuvalu =

Protestants in Tuvalu- Tuvalu is one of the most heavily Protestant nations in the world. In 2019, over 92% of the population belonged to a Protestant denomination.

The Congregational Christian Church of Tuvalu, (Tuvaluan: Te Ekalesia Kelisiano Tuvalu, EKT), is the de facto state church of Tuvalu, the only established church in the Reformed tradition in the world. Its adherents comprise about 86% of the 11,500 inhabitants of the archipelago, and theologically it is part of the Reformed tradition.

== History ==
Christianity first came to Tuvalu in 1861 when Elekana, a deacon of a Congregational church in Manihiki, Cook Islands became caught in a storm and drifted for eight weeks before landing at Nukulaelae. Elekana began proselytising Christianity. He was trained at Malua Theological College, a London Missionary Society school in Samoa, before beginning his work in establishing the Church of Tuvalu. In 1865, the Rev A. W. Murray of the London Missionary Society – a Protestant congregationalist missionary society – arrived as the first European missionary where he too proselytised among the inhabitants of Tuvalu.

By 1878, Christianity was well-established with preachers on each island. At the end of the 19th century, the ministers of what became the Church of Tuvalu were predominantly Samoans, who influenced the development of the Tuvaluan language and the music of Tuvalu.

== Denominations ==
In 1969, the EKT acquired its independence from the LMS, since which time it has sent some missionaries to serve Tuvaluan migrants in Fiji, New Zealand, Hawaii, Australia, and the Marshall Islands.

The second largest religious group in Tuvalu is the Brethren Church whose followers make up 3% of the population.

Other denominations include the Seventh-day Adventist Church, Baptists, Jehovah’s Witnesses, Assemblies of God, and The Church of Jesus Christ of Latter-day Saints.

== See also ==
- Religion in Tuvalu
- Church of Tuvalu
