= List of islands of Tuvalu =

Tuvalu consists of nine separate islands: six atolls and three reef islands. An atoll typically consists of several motus: Tuvalu has a total of 124 islands and islets. Each island is surrounded by a coral reef. The soils of Tuvalu's islands are usually shallow, porous, alkaline, coarse-textured, with carbonate mineralogy and high pH values of up to 8.2 to 8.9. The soils are usually deficient in most of the important nutrients needed for plant growth, so garden beds need to be enhanced with mulch to increase their fertility. Tuvalu's small, widely scattered atolls have a total land area of only about 26 square kilometres (10 square miles) making Tuvalu the fourth-smallest country in the world.

The sea level at the Funafuti tide gauge has been rising at a rate of 3.9 mm per year, and it has been determined that rising sea levels are causing more wave energy to be transferred across reef surfaces, which has tended to push more sand onto island shorelines, increasing islands’ land area. Over a recent four-decade period, there was a net increase in the land area of the islets of 2.9% (73.5 ha), although the changes were not uniform: About 74% of them increased in size and about 27% decreased in size.

== Islands of Tuvalu ==
The islands of Tuvalu are spread out between the latitude of 5° to 10° south and longitude of 176° to 180°, west of the International Date Line.

The name, Tuvalu, means "eight standing together" in Tuvaluan.

The Coral reefs of Tuvalu consists of three reef islands and six atolls, containing approximately 710 km^{2} (270 mi^{2}) of reef platforms. The reef islands have a different structure to the atolls, and are perhaps better described as “reef platforms,” as they are small, tabular platforms that lack the salt-water lagoon typically found on reef islands. The reef platforms do have a completely enclosed rim of dry land, and the rim surrounds the remnants of a lagoon, but these lagoon remnants have no connection to the open sea, and tend to dry up as coral debris accumulates in them over time. For example, Niutao has two brackish, saline lakes which are the degraded remnants of an ancient lagoon.

The smallest island, Niulakita, which is the ninth island in the Tuvaluan archipelago, has not been continuously inhabited. It has been privately owned since 1944, when the Gilbert and Ellice Islands Colony administration purchased the island and granted people from Vaitupu permission to settle there. However, in 1949, a successor administration made the controversial decision to expel the Vaitupuans from Niulakita, and arrange for residents of Niutao to settle there instead, because Niutao was considered to be overpopulated. Niulakita is a separate local government district, but it is administered as part of Niutao, and is represented in the Parliament of Tuvalu by members of the constituency of Niutao.

Islands of Tuvalu Islands of Tuvalu represented on the flag
Atoll/Island	Main village	Land area (km^{2})	Total area (km^{2})	Pop. (c. 2022)	Min. number of islets	Number of villages	Location
Atolls
Funafuti	Vaiaku	2.40	277	6,602	30	9	8°31′S 179°13′E
Nanumea	Lolua	3.87	22	610	5	2	05°41′S 176°09′E
Nui	Tanrake	2.83	17	514	21	4	07°13′29″S 177°09′37″E
Nukufetau	Savave	2.99	145	581	33	2	08°00′S 178°22′E
Nukulaelae	Fangaua	1.82	43	341	15	2	09°22′52″S 179°51′08″E
Vaitupu	Asau	5.60	10	1,007	9	7	07°28′S 178°41′E
Islands
Nanumanga	Tonga	3.00	3.00	391	5^{1)}	2	06°20′S 176°25′E
Niulakita	Niulakita	0.40	0.40	36	1	1	10°45′S 179°30′E
Niutao	Kulia	2.53	2.53	550	4^{1)}	2	06°06′S 177°16′E
Total
		25.44	520	10,632	124	34	
^{1)} main island plus islets in landlocked lagoon

At least 11 islands are inhabited, expanded over the biggest isles of the nine atolls, plus two islands in Funafuti. Tuvalu has ISO 3166-2 codes defined for 1 town council (Funafuti) and 7 island councils. Niulakita, which now has its own island council, is not listed as it is administered as part of Niutao.

== Royal Society of London investigation of the formation of coral reefs at Funafuti ==
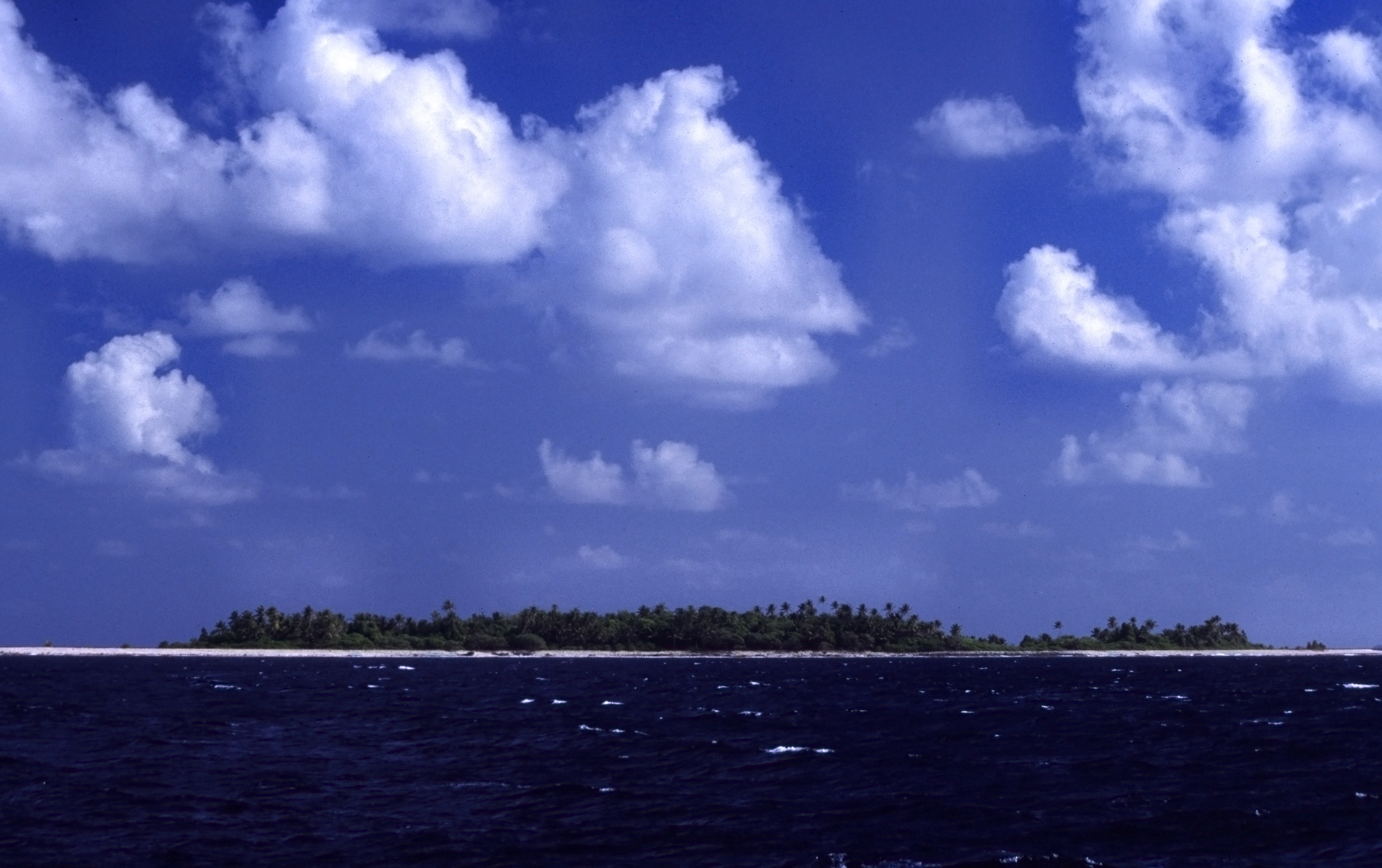
Coordinates: 8.31°S 179.13°E (Funafuti)

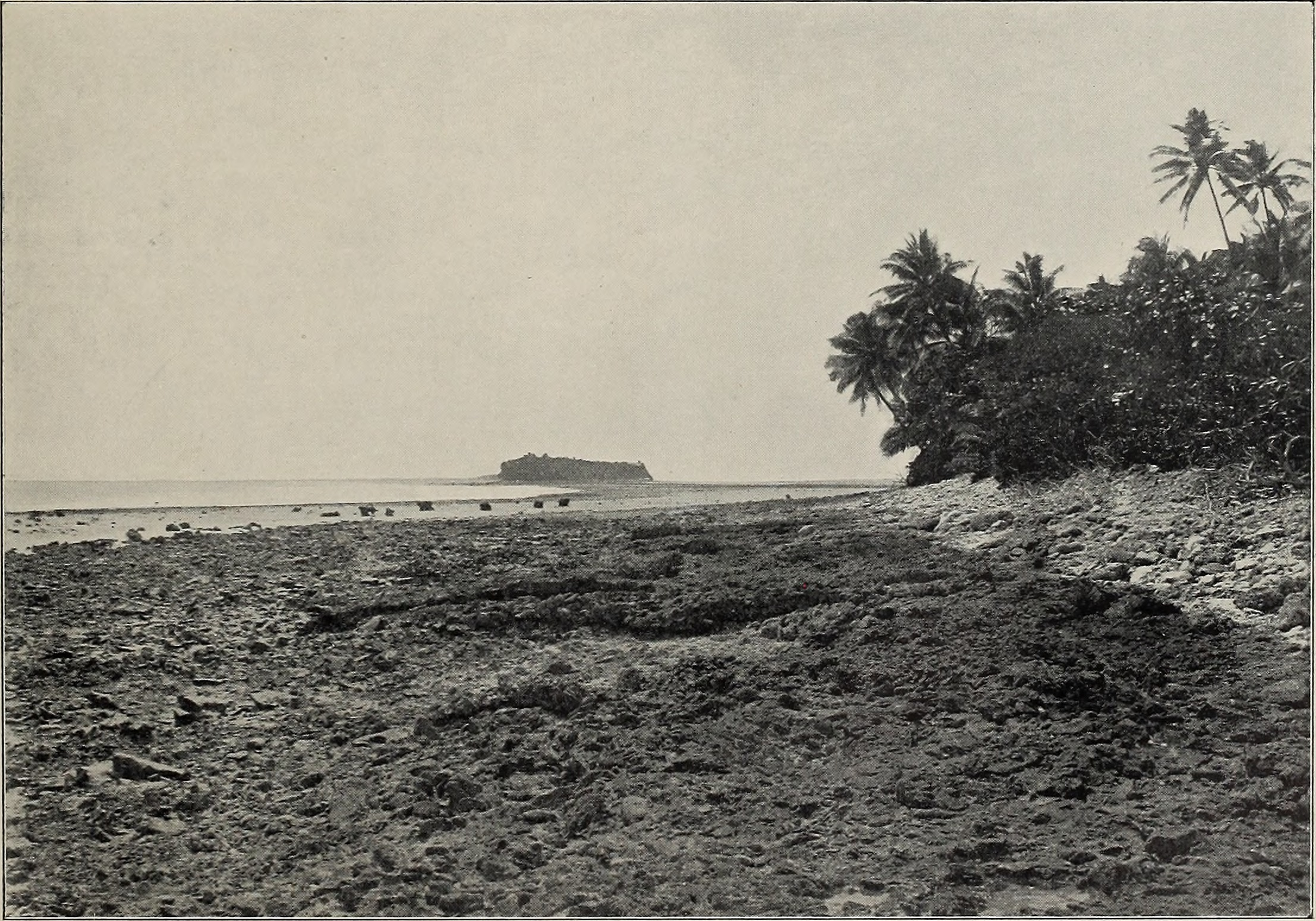
The atoll of Funafuti; borings into a coral reef and the results, being the report of the Coral Reef Committee of the Royal Society (1904)

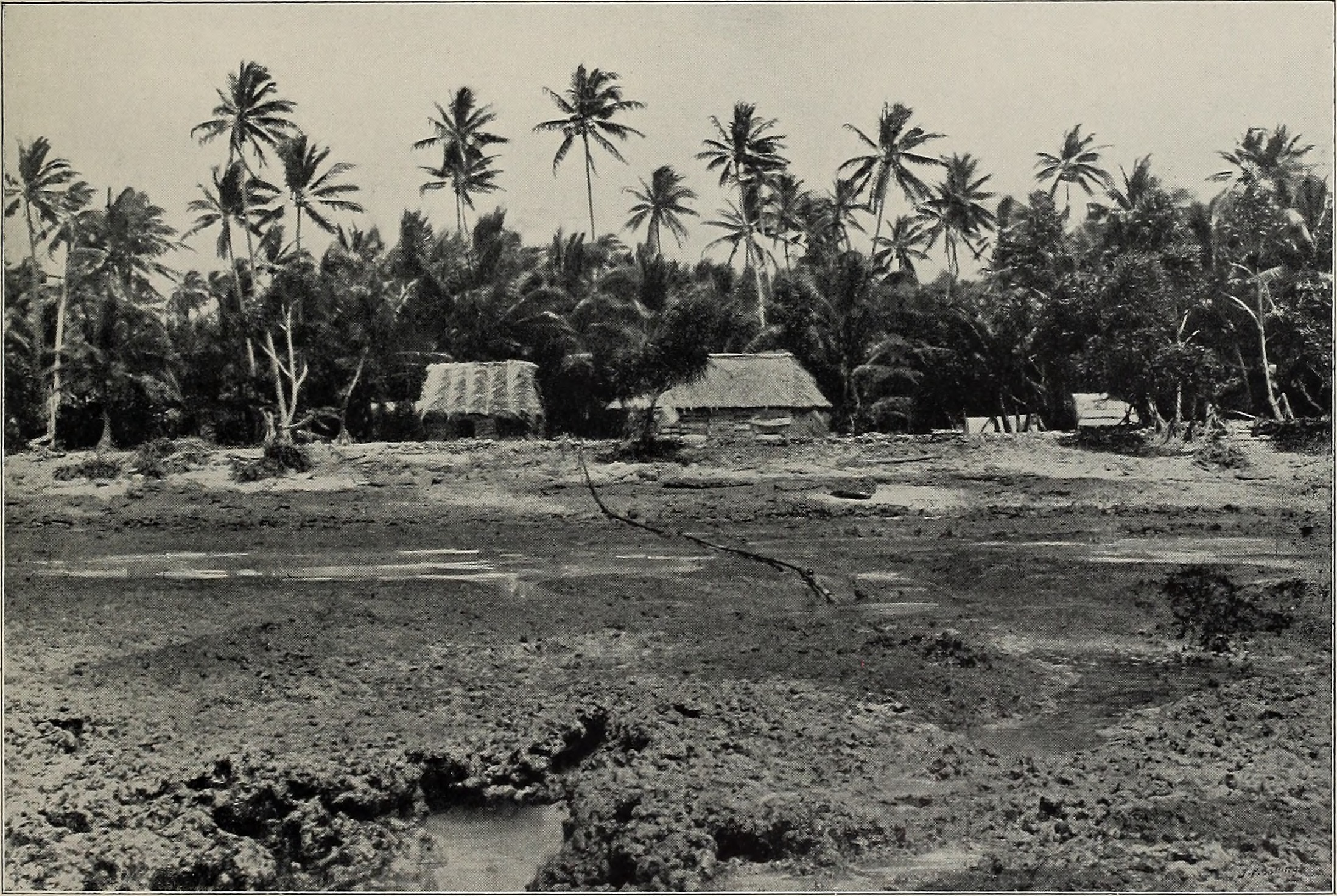
The atoll of Funafuti; borings into a coral reef and the results, being the report of the Coral Reef Committee of the Royal Society (1904)

An expedition (Funafuti Coral Reef Boring Expedition of the Royal Society) under Professor William Sollas of Oxford University, conducted by the Royal Society of London carried out drilling on the coral reef at Funafuti in 1896, 1897 and 1898.

HMS Penguin, under the command of Captain Arthur Mostyn Field, delivered the 1896 expedition to Funafuti in the Ellice Islands, arriving on 21 May 1896, and returned to Sydney on 22 August 1896. From 1896 to 1899 the Penguin was under the command of Captain Arthur Mostyn Field and her surveying work included further voyages to Funafuti atoll to deliver the expeditions of the Royal Society in 1897 and 1898. The surveys carried out by the Penguin resulted in the preparation of the Admiralty Nautical Chart 2983 for the islands.

The Royal Society of London were investigating the formation of coral reefs and whether traces of shallow-water organisms could be found at depth in the coral of Pacific atolls. Three expeditions used drilling equipment to take core samples of the coral reef. The boreholes on Fongafale islet are at the site now called Darwin's Drill, A goal of the expeditions was to drill down to confirm that the coral material was located on a base of volcanic rock. This investigation followed the work on the structure and distribution of coral reefs conducted by Charles Darwin in the Pacific. However, the geologic history of atolls is more complex than Darwin (1842) and Davis (1928) envisioned.

=== First expedition (1896) ===
The expedition was led by Professor William Johnson Sollas of the University of Oxford and included Professor Edgeworth David and Walter George Woolnough of the University of Sydney.

=== Second expedition (1897) ===
The expedition was led by Professor Edgeworth David of the University of Sydney (that included George Sweet as second-in-command, and Walter George Woolnough).

=== Third expedition (1898) ===
The expedition was led by Alfred Edmund Finckh of the University of Sydney.

== Results of the Royal Society expeditions ==
The purpose of the expedition was to attempt to settle the question as to the formation of coral atolls. The first expedition experienced defects in the boring machinery and the bore penetrated only slightly more than 100 feet (approx. 31 m). The second expedition reached a depth of 557 feet (170 m). The third expedition was successful in carrying the bore to 1,114 feet (340 m). The results provided support for Charles Darwin's theory of subsidence; in which there are four stages in development of coral reefs: a volcanic island forms, is surrounded by a fringing coral reef, as it subsides slowly a wide barrier reef forms, then after it has sunk below sea level the coral continues to grow forming a circular atoll. However, the geologic history of atolls is more complex than Darwin (1842) and Davis (1920 & 1928) envisioned.

== Structure of Funafuti atoll ==
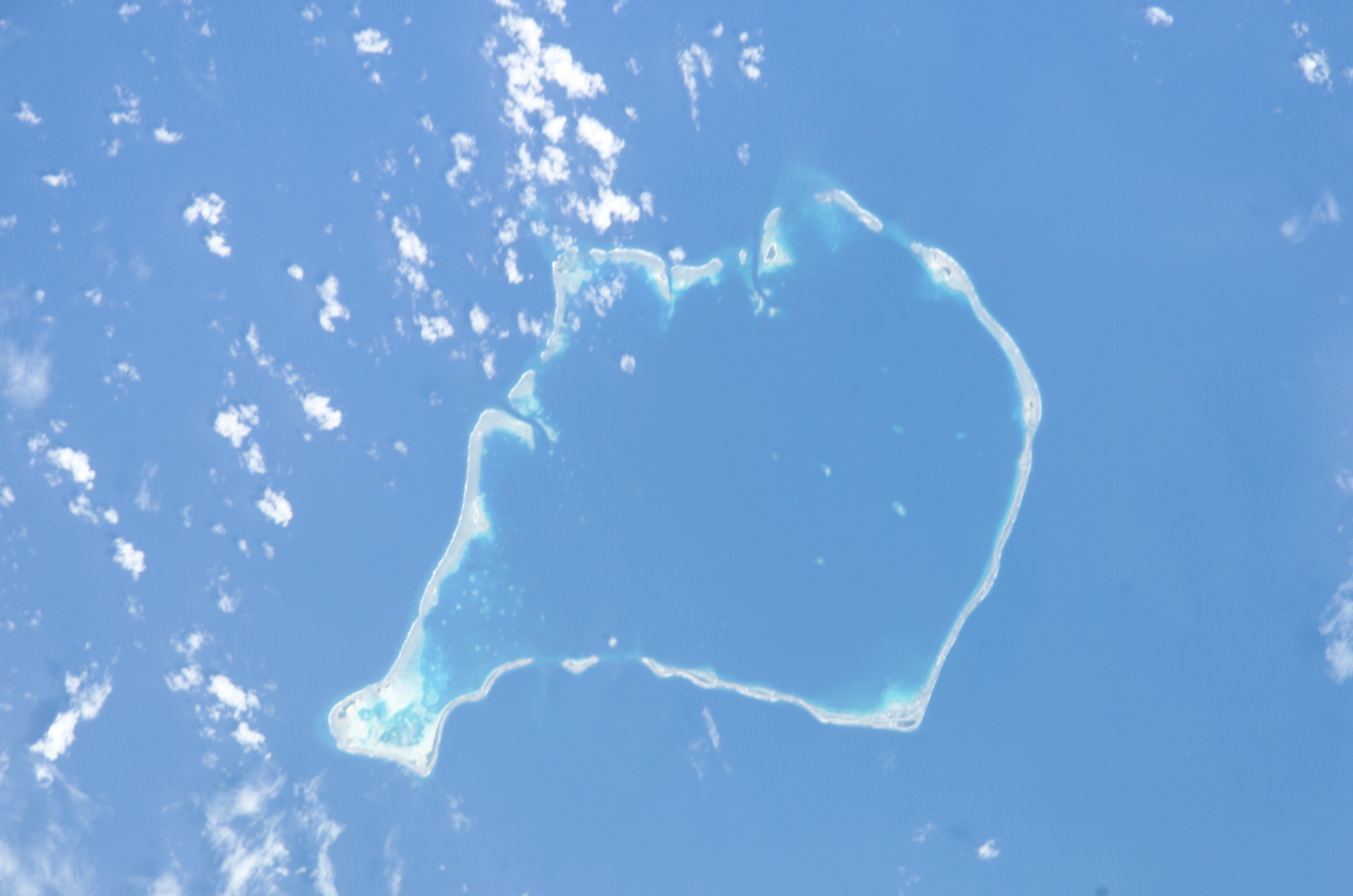
Funafuti atoll

The average depth in the Funafuti lagoon (Te Namo) is about 20 fathoms (37 m; 120 ft).

“Funafuti is an almost circular and conical submarine mountain 12,000 feet high, originally volcanic, and of immense geological age, much older than the relatively young and active mountains of the New Hebrides and Solomons. At its base on the ocean bed it is 30 miles wide in one of the directions tested, and 28 miles wide on the other. It rises in a gentle slope which gradually steepens to a point 2,400 feet below water level, after which it rises at an angle of 80 degrees to 840 feet below water level. From this point it rises vertically, like an enormous pillar, till reaches the surface in the form of a reef enclosing a lagoon of irregular size, but of which the extremities give a measurement of 13.5 by 10.0 miles”.

== See also ==
- ISO 3166-2:TV
- List of mammals of Tuvalu
- List of birds of Tuvalu
- List of butterflies of Tuvalu
- Funafuti Conservation Area
- Geography of Tuvalu
