= Church of Tuvalu =

State church of Tuvalu

Te Ekalesia Kelesiano Tuvalu
- Classification: Protestant
- Orientation: Calvinist
- Polity: Congregational
- Associations: Boys' Brigade International Fellowship, Council for World Mission; World Association for Christian Communication; World Communion of Reformed Churches; Pacific Conference of Churches; World Council of Churches
- Region: Tuvalu
- Headquarters: Funafuti
- Founder: Elekana
- Origin: 1861
- Separated from: London Missionary Society, Christian Congregational Church of Samoa
- Congregations: 18
- Members: c. 9,144 (2022)

The Christian Church of Tuvalu (Tuvaluan: Te Ekalesia Kelisiano Tuvalu, EKT), is a Christian church and is the single largest religious denomination in the country. This status entitles it to "the privilege of performing special services on major national events". In the 2022 census, its adherents comprise about 86% of the 10,632 inhabitants of the archipelago.

Theologically, it is part of the Reformed tradition.

Section 23 of the Constitution of Tuvalu guarantees freedom of belief, including the freedom of thought, religion and belief, the freedom to change religion or belief, the right not to receive religious instruction at school or to attend religious ceremonies at school, and the right not to "take an oath or make an affirmation that is contrary to [one's] religion or beliefs".

== History ==
Christianity first came to Tuvalu in 1861 when Elekana, a deacon of a Congregational church in Manihiki, Cook Islands became caught in a storm and drifted for eight weeks before landing at Nukulaelae. Elekana began evangelizing Christianity. He was trained at Malua Theological College, a London Missionary Society school in Samoa, before beginning his work in establishing the Church of Tuvalu. In 1865, the Reverend Archibald Wright Murray of the London Missionary Society (LMS) – a Protestant congregationalist missionary society – arrived as the first European missionary where he too evangelized among the inhabitants of Tuvalu. Murray was followed by the Reverend Samuel James Whitmee in 1870.

The first pastors were: Ioane at Nukulaelae and Nanumanga (1865–88); Kirisome at Nui (1865–99); Tapumanaia Kitiona at Niutao (1865); Tema at Funafuti (1870–89); Jeremia at Vaitupu (1880–95); In 1896 the pastor on Funafuti was Simona. The ministers of what became the Church of Tuvalu were predominantly Samoans who graduated from Malua Theological College, and who influenced the development of the Tuvaluan language and the music of Tuvalu.

The LMS Church in the Ellice Islands remained part of the Samoan LMS Church’s congregational system until 1958, and was administered (together with Tokelau and the Gilbert Islands, under the title, the Northwest Outstations of the Samoan Mission. In 1958, the LMS Church in the Ellice Islands became self-governing. Ellice Islander ministers were trained at Mälua, the LMS College in Western Samoa. The Samoan language Bible was used until 1978 when a Tuvaluan-language New Testament was published.

In 1969, the ETK acquired its independence from the LMS, since which time it has sent some missionaries to serve Tuvaluan migrants in Fiji, New Zealand, Hawaii, Australia, and the Marshall Islands.

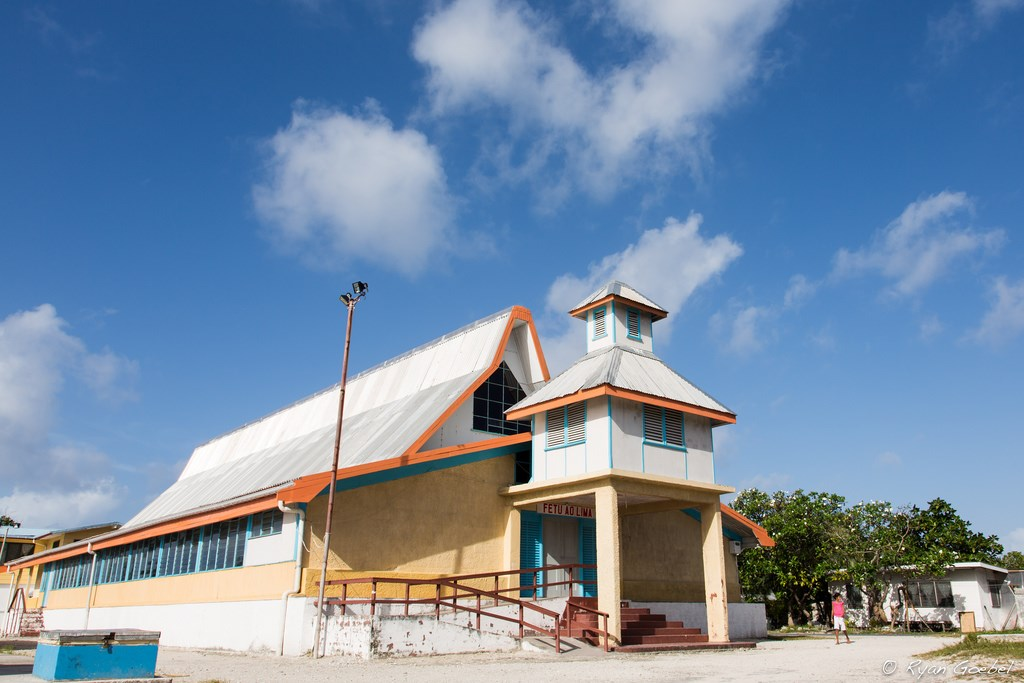
Fetu Ao Lima (Morning Star Church), Congregational Christian Church of Tuvalu

The former Governor-General of Tuvalu, Rev Sir Filoimea Telito, presided over the Church until his death in July 2011.

The Reverend Kalahati Kilei, President of the ETK and Pastor for the island community of Funafuti, died on 10 September 2019 at Princess Margaret Hospital.

The most prominent building on Funafuti is the Fētu'ao Lima (Morning Star Church) of the Church of Tuvalu.

The Church currently publishes a bulletin in the Tuvaluan and English languages.

== Beliefs ==
As the church is an offshoot of the London Missionary Society, it is Calvinist in doctrine and congregational in organisation. There is an ordination for women which occurred on July 16, 2022, with the first two women, Rev Oliula Kalahati and Rev. Sulufaiga Uota (EKT Head Office, 2022). The Apostles' Creed and the Nicene Creed are generally accepted. Being the de facto state church, the Church of Tuvalu dominates most aspects of social, cultural and political life in the country.

== Fetuvalu Secondary School ==
The Church operates Fetuvalu Secondary School, a day school which is located on Funafuti.

== Relations ==
The Church is a member of the World Association for Christian Communication, the Boys' Brigade International Fellowship, the World Communion of Reformed Churches, Council for World Mission, the World Council of Churches, and the Pacific Conference of Churches. It also has ties with the Methodist Church in Fiji, the Congregational Christian Church in Samoa, the Kiribati Uniting Church, the Uniting Church in Australia, and the Methodist and Presbyterian churches in New Zealand.

== Emigration ==
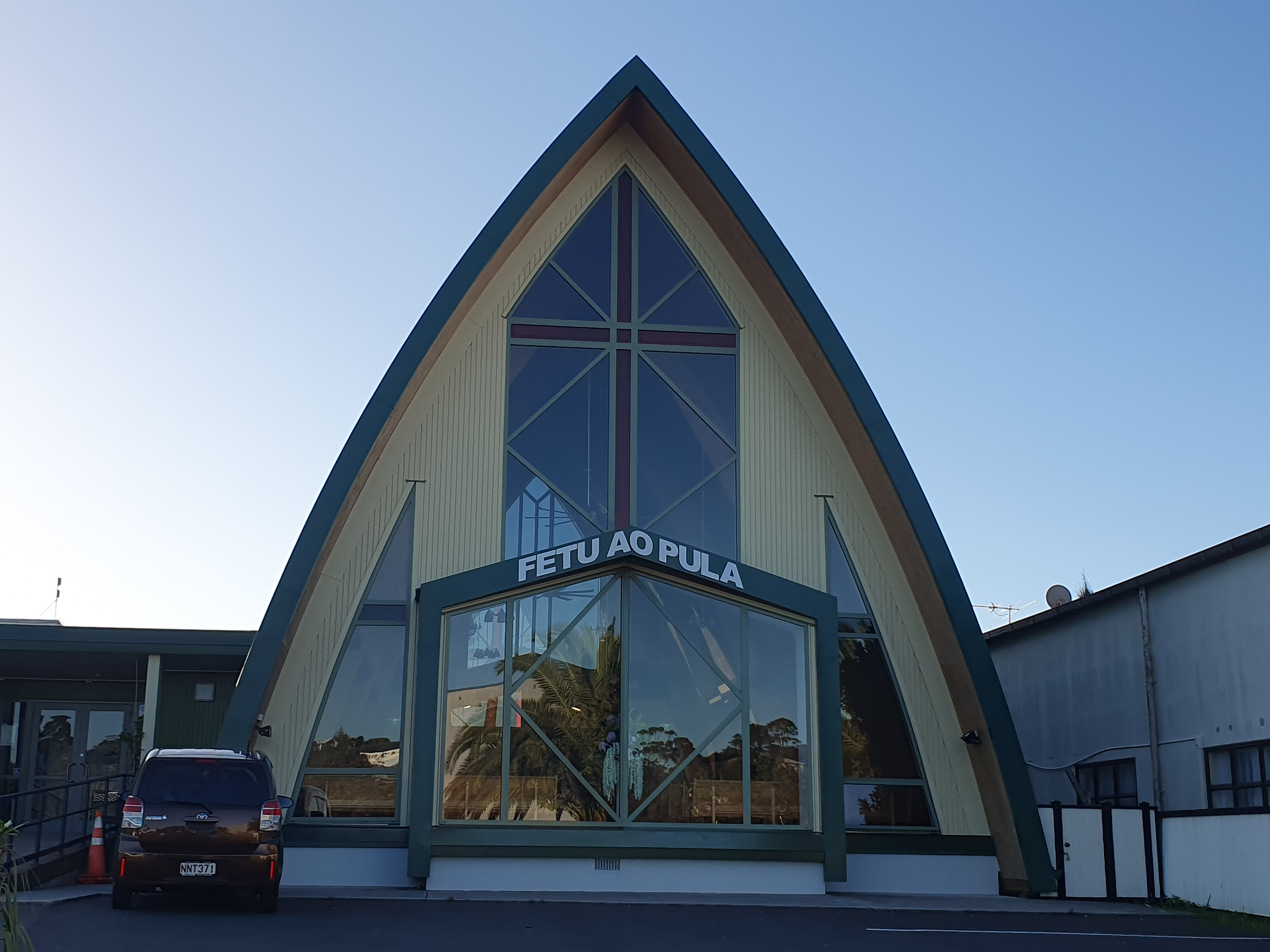
Tuvaluan Christian Church in Henderson, West Auckland, New Zealand

During the early years of the 21st century, urbanization and environmental issues have led to many citizens leaving Tuvalu to start new lives in other countries. Many people have taken their beliefs with them and there are now EKT churches in New Zealand, Australia, Hawaii, Marshall Islands, and Fiji.

The Tuvalu Community Church congregation of Henderson, Auckland, New Zealand, was established in 1992. In 2021 the congregation opened a new church, which was designed by South Pacific Architecture, which won a Public Architecture Award at the 2021 Auckland Architecture Awards.

== See also ==
- Religion in Tuvalu
- Protestantism in Tuvalu
