= Protected areas of Tuvalu =

Protected areas in Tuvalu

Protected areas of Tuvalu consist of protected areas located within the central Pacific country of Tuvalu and its territorial waters. One such area is the Funafuti Conservation Area, which is a marine protected area on the western reef area of Funafuti atoll.

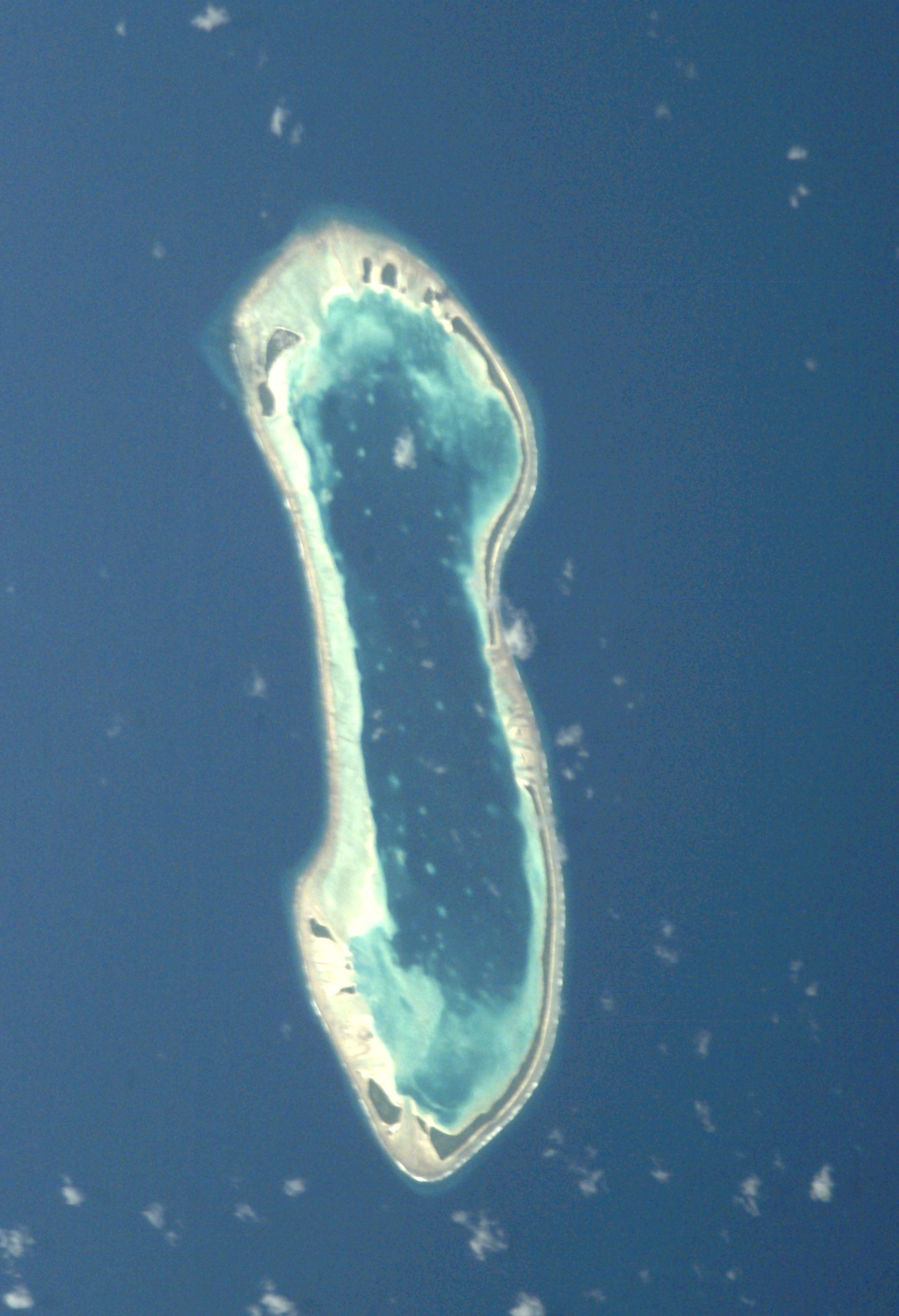
The lagoon of Nukulaelae atoll is a marine protected area

As of April 2024, four Marine Protected Areas (MPAs) and four Locally Managed Marine Areas (LMMAs) have been established on the outer islands. Tuvalu has not nominated any wetlands under the Convention on Wetlands of International Importance (known as the Ramsar Convention). The Exclusive Economic Zone (EEZ) of Tuvalu, consists of 749,790 km^{2} (289,500 mi^{2}) of sea. No parts of the land or EEZ of Tuvalu has been listed by UNESCO as a World Heritage Site. As of May 2021, there are no Other Effective Area-Based Conservation Measures (OECM) in Tuvalu that are registered on the World Database on OECM.

== Marine Protected Areas and Locally Managed Marine Areas ==
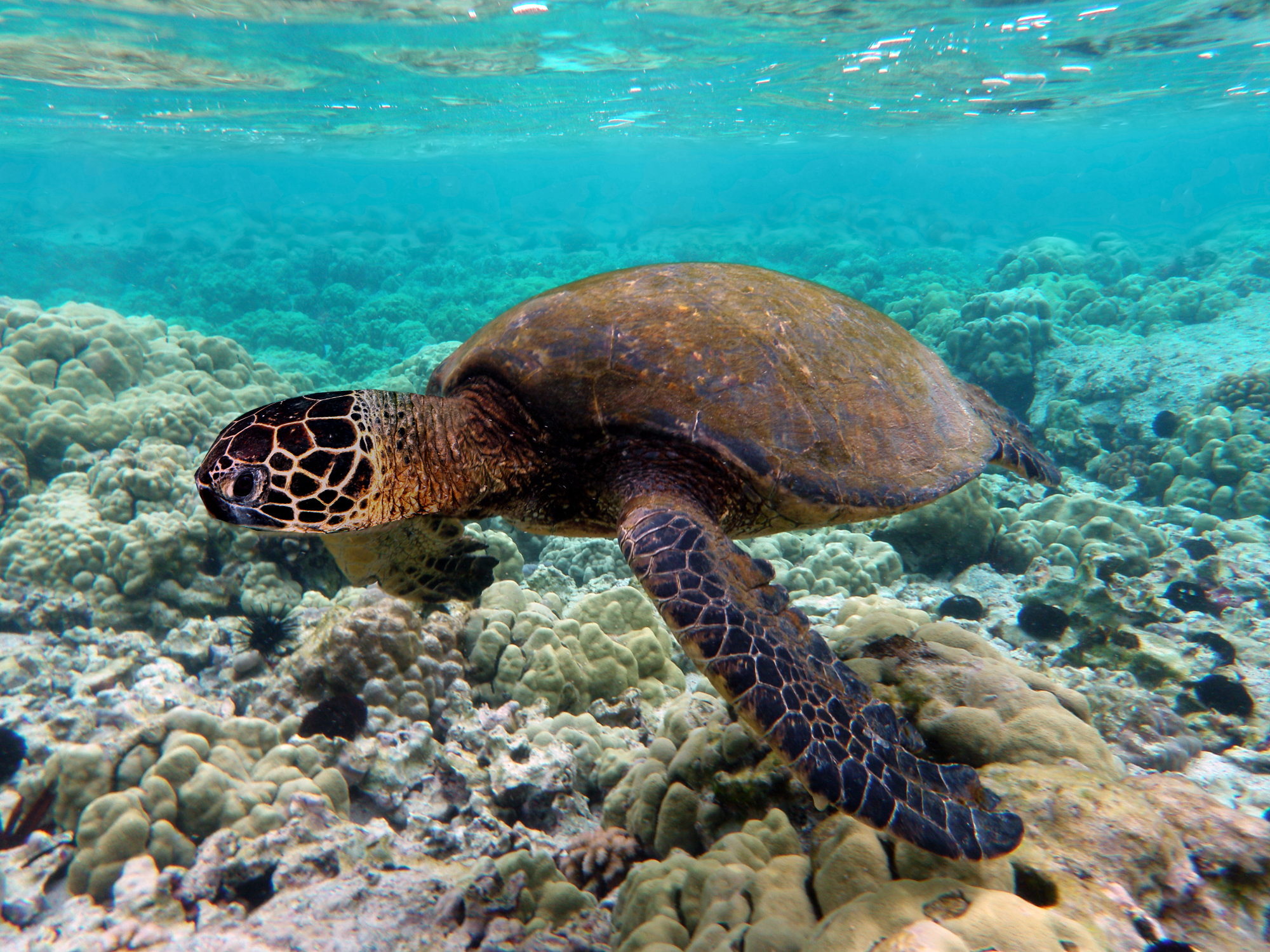
Green sea turtle

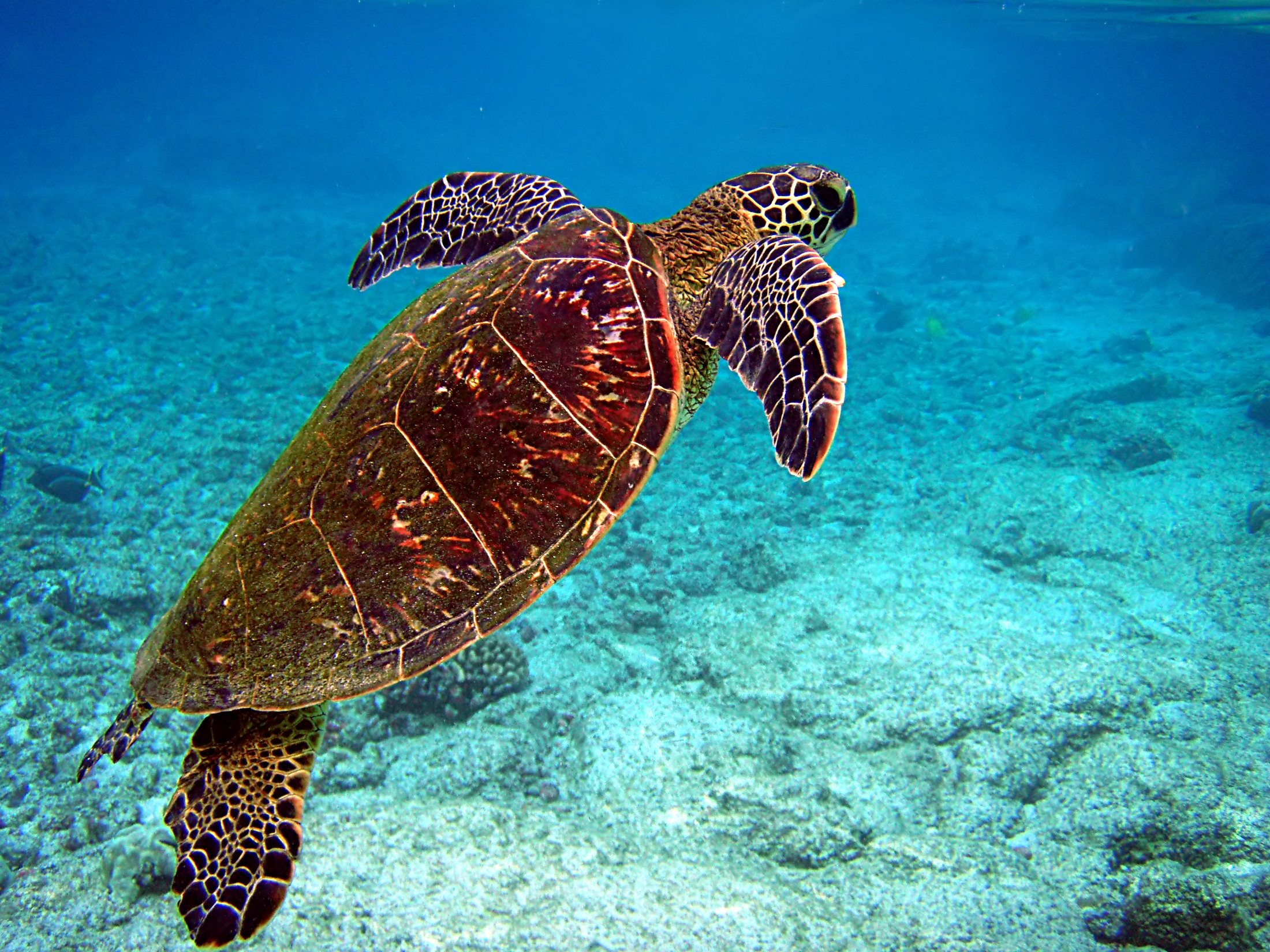
Green sea turtle swimming towards surface

In addition to the Funafuti Conservation Area, which is located on Funafuti, four Marine Protected Areas (MPAs) and four Locally Managed Marine Areas (LMMAs) have been established on the outer islands of Tuvalu. The World Database on Protected Areas (WDPA) identifies the following MPAs and LMMAs in Tuvalu:

Funafuti Conservation Area, 40 km^{2} (15 sq mi), is a Marine Protected Area (Community Conservation Area), which is managed by the Funafuti island Council (Kaupule o Funafuti).
Nanumaga Marine Protected Area, 0.03 km^{2} (0.012 sq mi), is a MPA, which is managed by the Nanumaga Island Council (Kaupule o Nanumaga). The MPA encompasses the entire island. Spear fishing is also totally banned on the reef and, no fishing is allowed on the reef on the western side of the island, except handlining.
Nanumea Marine Protected Area, 2.02 km^{2} (0.78 sq mi), is a MPA, which is managed by the Nanumea Island Council (Kaupule o Nanumea). The MPA was established in 2006 as a no-fishing zone covering about 20% of the total reef area of Nanumea.
Niulakita Locally Managed Marine Area, 0.21 km^{2} (0.081 sq mi), is a LMMA, managed by the Niulakita Island Council (Kaupule o Niulakita).
Niutao Locally Managed Marine Area, 1.67 km^{2} (0.64 sq mi), is a LMMA, managed by the Niutao Island Council (Kaupule o Niutao). The LMMA encompasses all of the reef; with small conservation areas established over specific places on the reef.
Nukufetau Marine Protected Area, 12.75 km^{2} (4.92 sq mi), is a MPA, which is managed by the Nukufetau Island Council (Kaupule o Nukufetau). The MPA encompasses most of the lagoon; with a conservation area established over the remainder of the lagoon.
Nukulaelae Marine Protected Area, 3.26 km^{2} (1.26 sq mi), is a MPA, which is managed by the Nukulaelae Island Council (Kaupule o Nukulaelae). The MPA covers the lagoon.
Nui Locally Managed Marine Area, 12.24 km^{2} (4.73 sq mi), is a LMMA, managed by the Nui Island Council (Kaupule o Nui). The LMMA covers the lagoon and reef.
Vaitupu Locally Managed Marine Area, 0.22 km^{2} (0.085 sq mi), is a LMMA, managed by the Vaitupu Island Council (Kaupule o Vaitupu). The LMMA encompassing most of the larger lagoon; with conservation areas established over the remainder of the larger lagoon and the smaller lagoon at the north end of the island.

== Funafuti Conservation Area ==
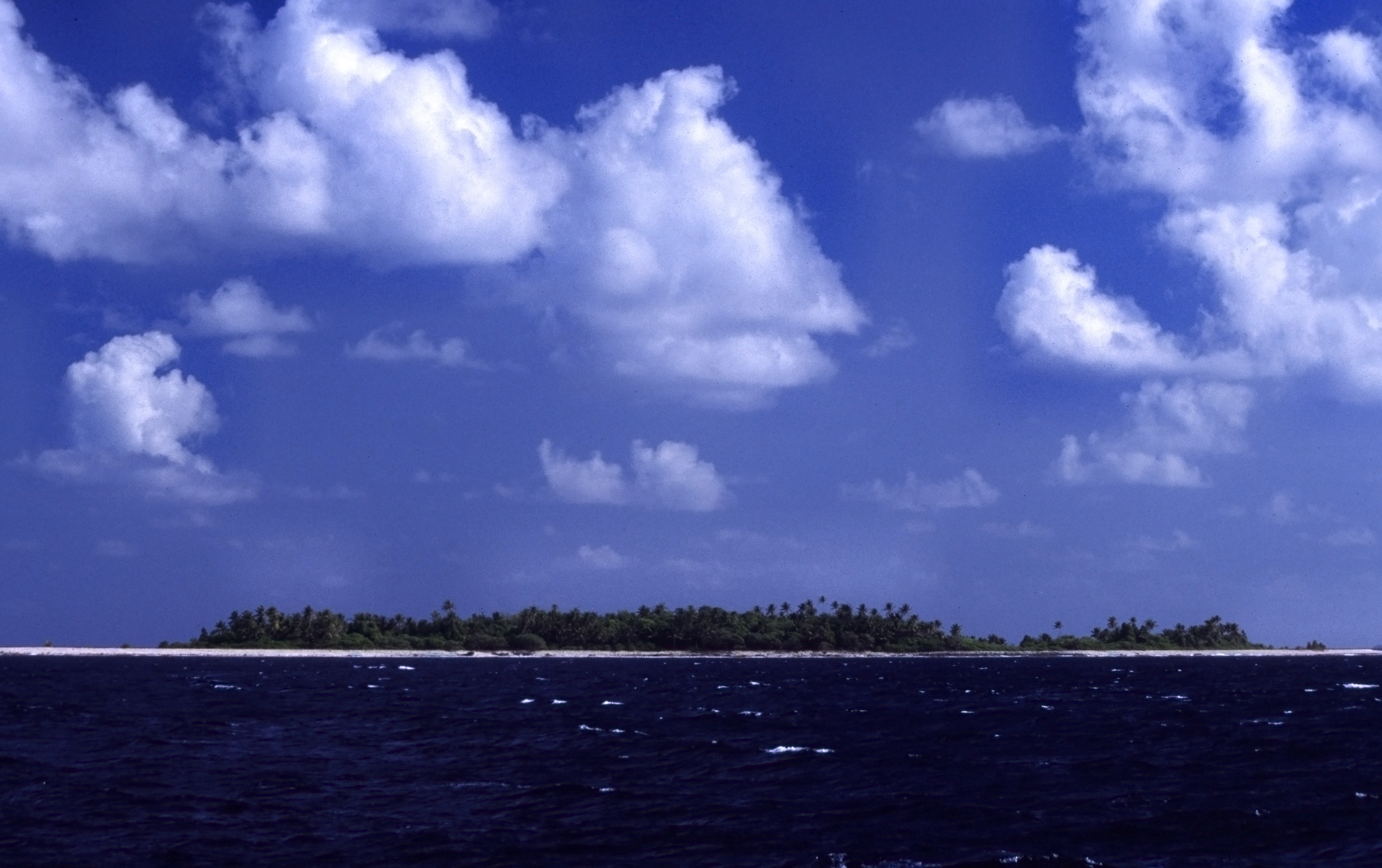
Funafuti

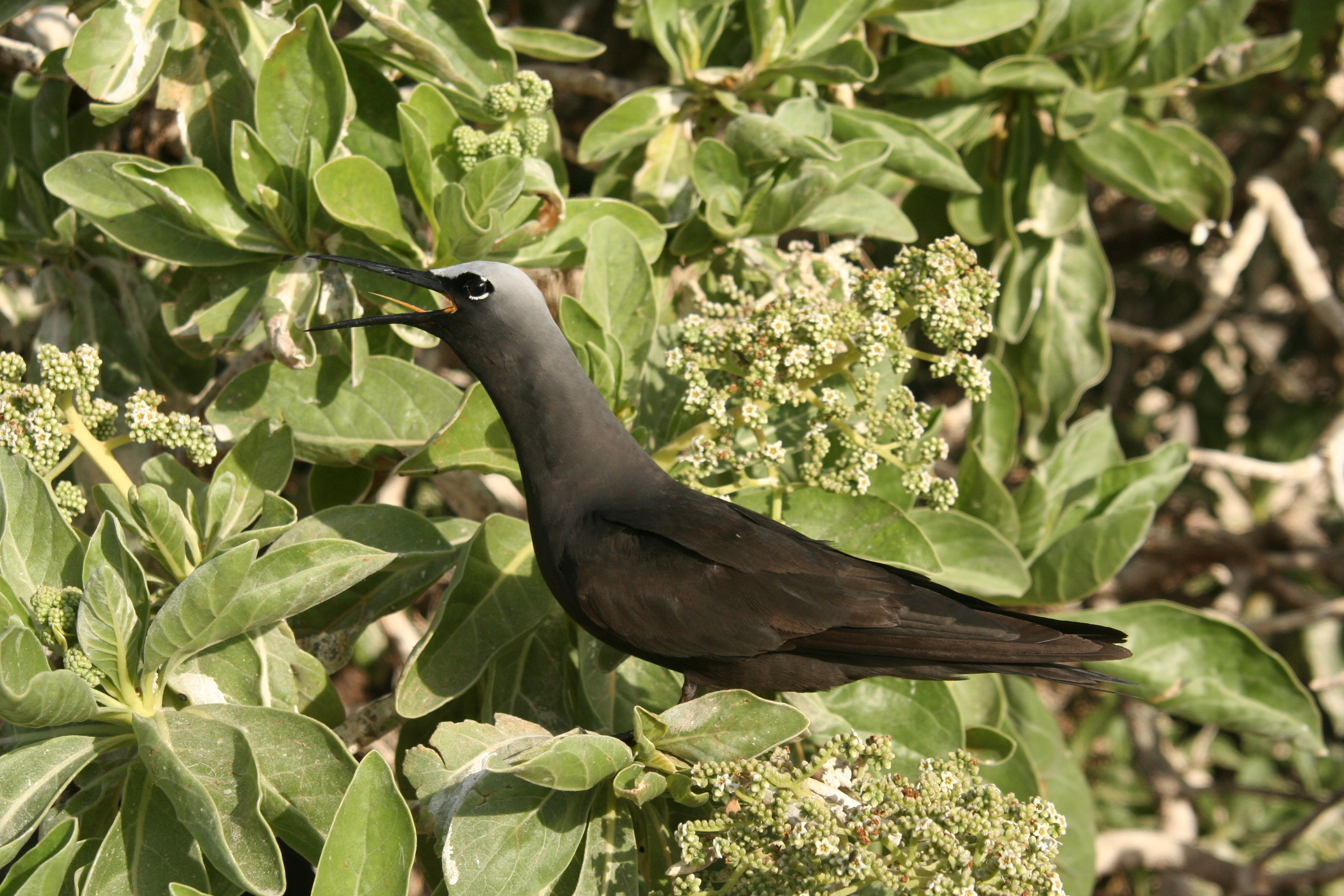
Black noddy calling at colony

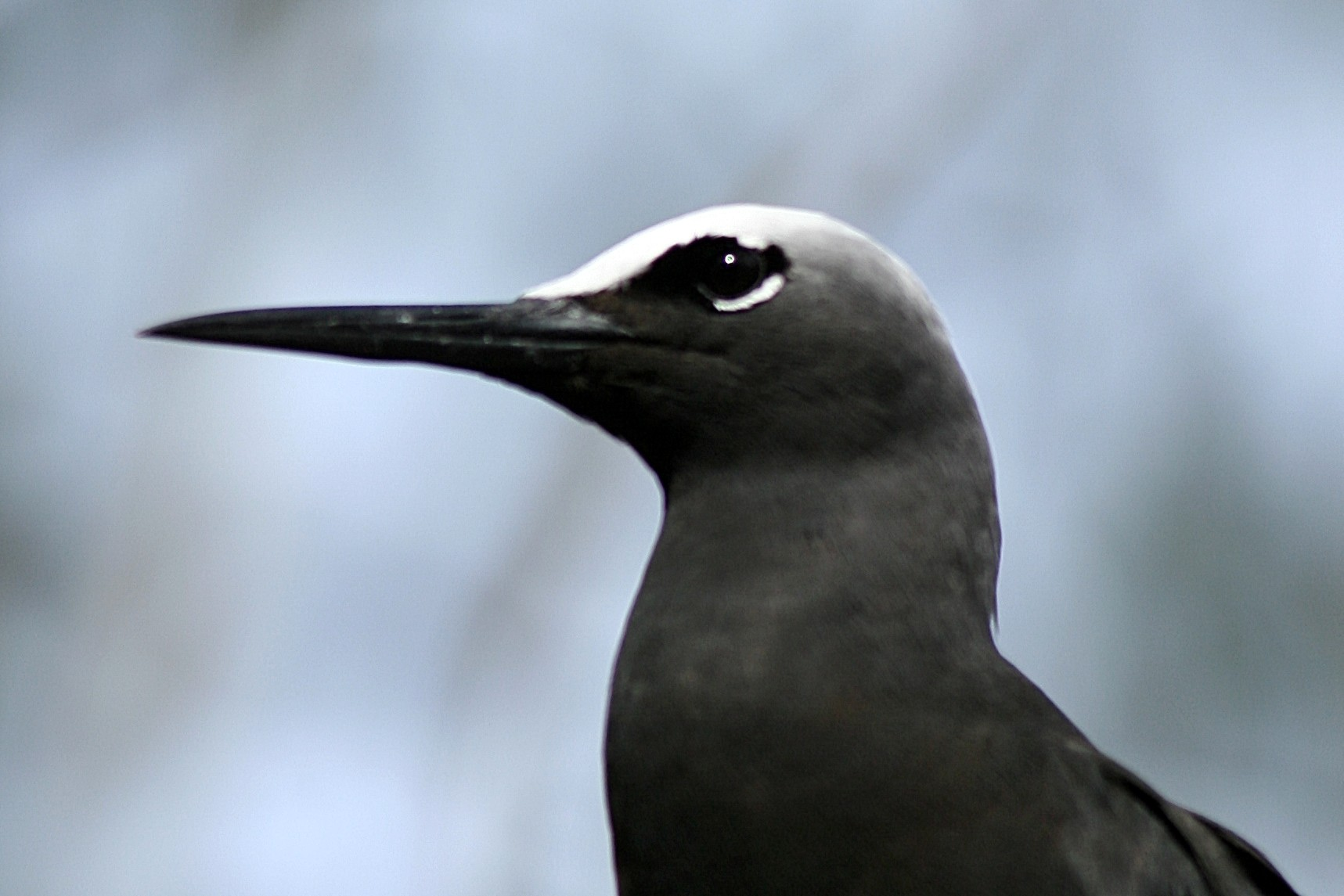
Black noddy

The rising population on Funafuti resulted in an increased demand on fish stocks in Funafuti lagoon (Te Namo). In 1996, the Funafuti Conservation Area was established along the western rim of the reef of Funafuti atoll, which included six motu (islets). The Government of Tuvalu created the Kogatapu in the Kaupule o Funafuti Conservation Area Order made under Section 3 of the Conservation Area Act, which order took effect on 1 December 1999.

The Funafuti Conservation Area has an area of 33 km^{2} (12.74 square miles), and includes 20 per cent of the reef area of Funafuti atoll. The land area of the six islets in the conservation area is 8 ha (20 acres). The islets are nesting sites for the green sea turtle (Chelonia mydas) and Fualopa islet hosts a breeding colony of black noddy (Anous minutes).

The marine environment of the conservation area includes reef, lagoon, channel and ocean; and are home to many species of fish, corals, algae and invertebrates. Surveys were carried out in May 2010 of the reef habitats of Nanumea, Nukulaelae and Funafuti (including the Funafuti Conservation Area) identified the total number of 607 fish species in the reef environment of these atolls.

A 2007 survey established that fish populations had increased as a result of the Funafuti Conservation Area. Large-sized individual fishes of the highly prized target food species, such as grouper and snapper were observed; the presence of so many large fish of desirable target food species indicates that there is very low fishing pressure in the Funafuti Conservation Area, although enforcement by conservation rangers of the no-fishing rules is necessary to preserve the fish stock.
