= Niuoko =

Niuoko Islet, Nukulaelae
- Atoll
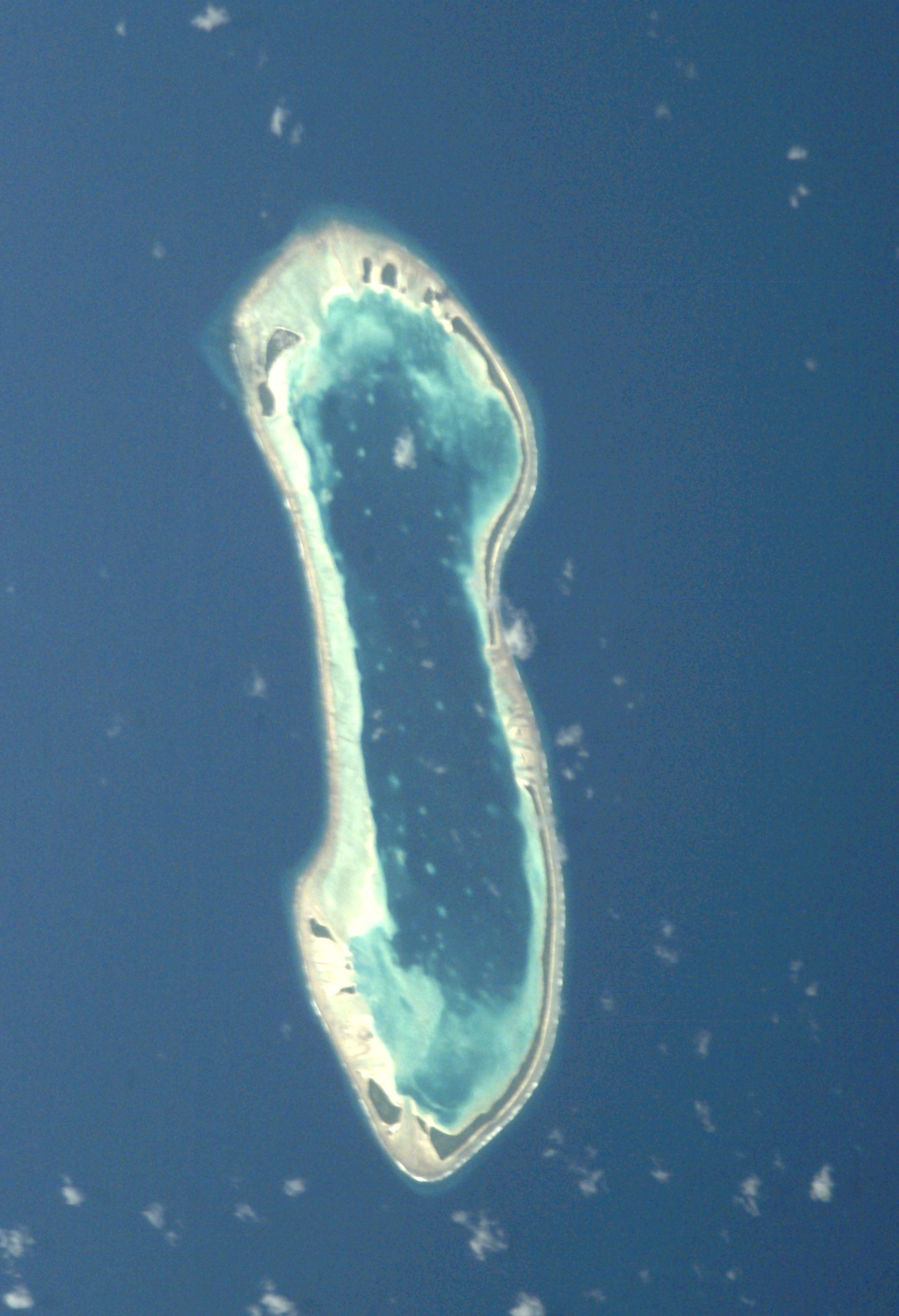
- Nukulaelae atoll from space

- Location within Tuvalu
- Coordinates: 09°22′52″S 179°51′08″E
- Country: Tuvalu
- Time zone: GMT+12

Niuoko Islet is the easternmost point of Tuvalu, which is located in Nukulaelae Atoll.

The Nukulaelae Conservation Area covers the eastern end of the lagoon. A baseline survey of marine life in the conservation zone was conducted in 2010.

In 1865, a trading captain acting on behalf of the German firm of J.C. Godeffroy & Sohn obtained a 25-year lease to Niuoko.

During the time the lease was in effect, the islanders and the Germans argued over the lease, including its terms and the importation of labourers. However, the Germans would remain until the lease expired in 1890.
