= Tuvaluan =

Tuvaluan can refer to:

- The Tuvaluan language, an Austronesian language spoken in Tuvalu, Fiji, Kiribati, Nauru and New Zealand
- Something of, from, or related to Oceanian island nation of Tuvalu
- Tuvaluan people
