= ISO 3166-2:TV =

Entry for Tuvalu in ISO 3166-2

ISO 3166-2:TV is the entry for Tuvalu in ISO 3166-2, part of the ISO 3166 standard published by the International Organization for Standardization (ISO), which defines codes for the names of the principal subdivisions (e.g., provinces or states) of all countries coded in ISO 3166-1.

Currently for Tuvalu, ISO 3166-2 codes are defined for one town council and seven island councils. Niulakita, which now has its own island council, is not listed as it is administered as part of Niutao.

Each code consists of two parts separated by a hyphen. The first part is TV, the ISO 3166-1 alpha-2 code of Tuvalu. The second part is three letters.

== Current codes ==
Subdivision names are listed as in the ISO 3166-2 standard published by the ISO 3166 Maintenance Agency (ISO 3166/MA).

Click on the button in the header to sort each column.

Code	Subdivision name (en)	Subdivision category
TV-FUN	Funafuti	town council
TV-NMG	Nanumaga	island council
TV-NMA	Nanumea	island council
TV-NIT	Niutao	island council
TV-NUI	Nui	island council
TV-NKF	Nukufetau	island council
TV-NKL	Nukulaelae	island council
TV-VAI	Vaitupu	island council

== Changes ==
The following changes to the entry have been announced in newsletters by the ISO 3166/MA since the first publication of ISO 3166-2 in 1998:

Edition/Newsletter	Date issued	Description of change in newsletter	Code/Subdivision change
Newsletter I-8	2007-04-17	Addition of the administrative subdivisions and of their code elements	Subdivisions added: 1 town council, 7 island councils
ISO 3166-2:2007	2007-12-13	Second edition of ISO 3166-2 (this change was not announced in a newsletter)	Codes: Nui: TV-NIU → TV-NUI

== See also ==
- Subdivisions of Tuvalu
