= Religion in Tuvalu =

Religion in Tuvalu (2022 census)
1. Church of Tuvalu (86%)
2. Other Christian (10%)
3. Baháʼí Faith (1%)
4. Other religions (2%)
5. Not stated (1%)

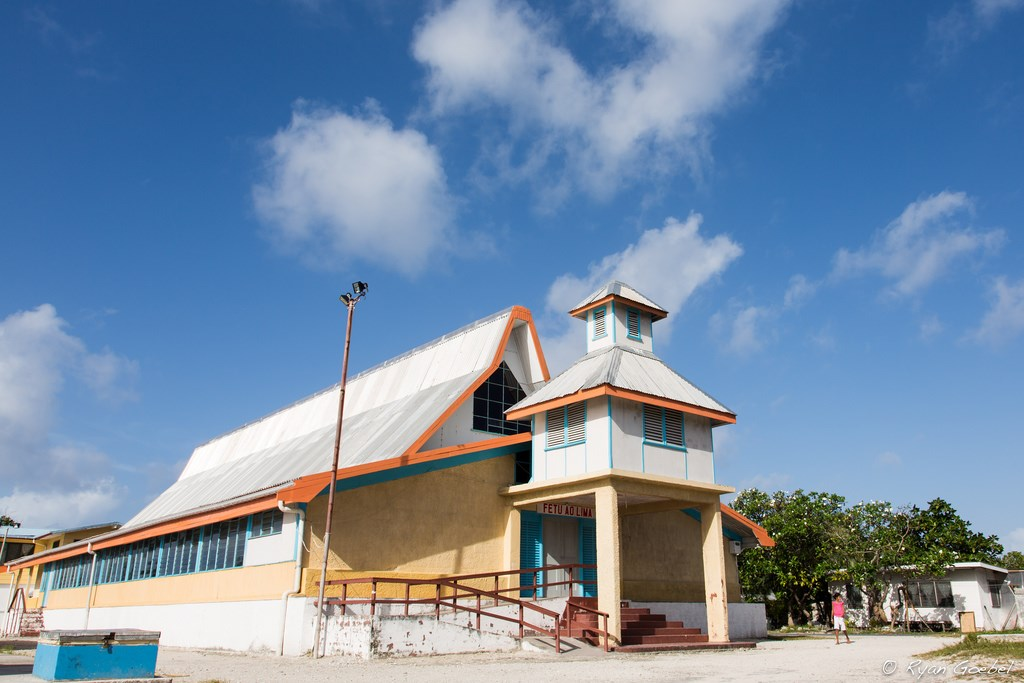
Fetu Ao Lima (Morning Star Church) in the capital Funafuti

Christianity is the predominant religion in Tuvalu, with Calvinism being the single largest denomination.

Approximately 86% of the population belonged to the Church of Tuvalu (Tuvaluan: Te Ekalesia Kelisiano Tuvalu, EKT) in the 2022 census and it is the state church of Tuvalu, although in practice this merely entitles it to "the privilege of performing special services on major national events"; it is Calvinist in orientation and has a Congregationalist polity.

== Church of Tuvalu ==
Adherents of the Church of Tuvalu comprise about 86% of the 10,632 inhabitants of Tuvalu.

All nine islands of Tuvalu, encompassing a combined land area of 26 square kilometres (10 sq mi), have traditional chiefs (alikis) who are members of the Church of Tuvalu.

The most prominent building on Funafuti is the Fētu'ao Lima (Morning Star Church) of the Church of Tuvalu.

== Other religions/denominations ==
Most followers of other religions or denominations, making up small populations of members of the Seventh-day Adventist Church (2%), the Tuvalu Brethren Church (a charismatic Protestant denomination) (3%), the Jehovah's Witnesses (1%) and Catholics (1%), are found in the capital city, Funafuti.

The Baháʼí Faith constitutes 1% of the population. The Baháʼís are mainly found on Nanumea, and also Funafuti.

The Catholic community is served by the Mission Sui Iuris of Funafuti. The sole Catholic church in the country is Teone Church in Vaiaku.

There are also smaller numbers of Muslims, Baptists, members of the Church of Jesus Christ of Latter-day Saints and atheists.

== Religious demographics ==
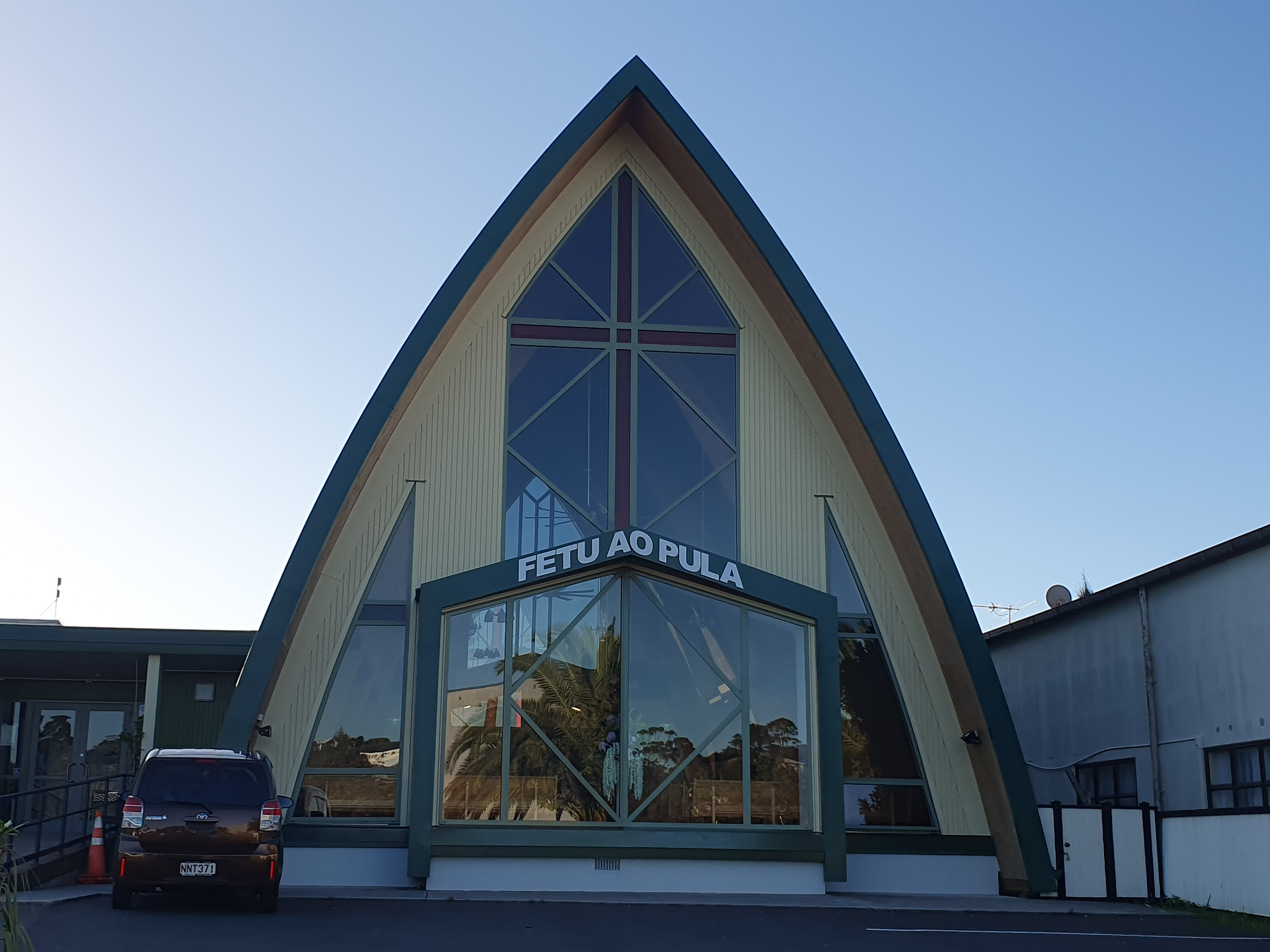
Tuvaluan Christian Church in West Auckland, New Zealand

The population of Tuvalu was 11,500 as of 2022 estimates, up from 10,837 in the 2012 census.

As of 2022, the various denominations following Christianity make up roughly (rounding errors with small overall population) 96% of the population. Overall, the largest faith groups were:

- Church of Tuvalu, 86%
- Brethren, 3%
- Seventh-day Adventist Church, 2%
- Assemblies of God, 2%
- Catholic Church, 1%
- The Church of Jesus Christ of Latter-day Saints, 1%
- Jehovah's Witnesses, 1%
- Baháʼí Faith, 1%

== Religious freedom ==
The Constitution of Tuvalu was amended in 2023, its preamble states that the people of Tuvalu are "thankful that our islands and oceans, known by its ancient name as the Tuvalu Islands, were given by God as our home in the Pacific Ocean", and later affirms "our identity as a Christian nation", and reaffirms Tuvalu as a "free and democratic sovereign nation based on Christian Principles, Tuvaluan values and culture and the Rule of Law". Section 23 (2) of the Constitution specifically establishes the freedom of belief, which is stated as including –

"(a) freedom of thought, religion and belief; and

(b) freedom to change religion or belief; and

(c) freedom, either alone or with others, to show and to spread, both in public and in private, a religion or belief, in worship, teaching, practice and observance."

Section 23 (8) states that: "The protection given by this section to freedom of religion or belief applies equally to freedom not to have or hold a particular religion or belief, or any religion or belief."

=== Court protection ===
In 2003, some members of the Tuvalu Brethren Church on Nanumanga reported that discrimination, including acts and threats of violence, hindered their religious freedom on that island, which prompted them to commence proceedings in the High Court of Tuvalu in 2004; the case moved through the courts, and in 2009 the Court of Appeal of Tuvalu determined that the constitutional rights of these members had been breached.

In 2008, four members of the Tuvalu Brethren Church on Nanumaga sued in the High Court claiming unlawful dismissal from their employment on grounds that included unlawful discrimination on the basis of religion and that their constitutional right to freedom of belief, expression and association had been denied. Three of the claims were dismissed, with a fourth plaintiff being awarded general damages and aggravated damages.

== See also ==
- Protestantism in Tuvalu
- Islam in Tuvalu
