= Fetuvalu Secondary School =

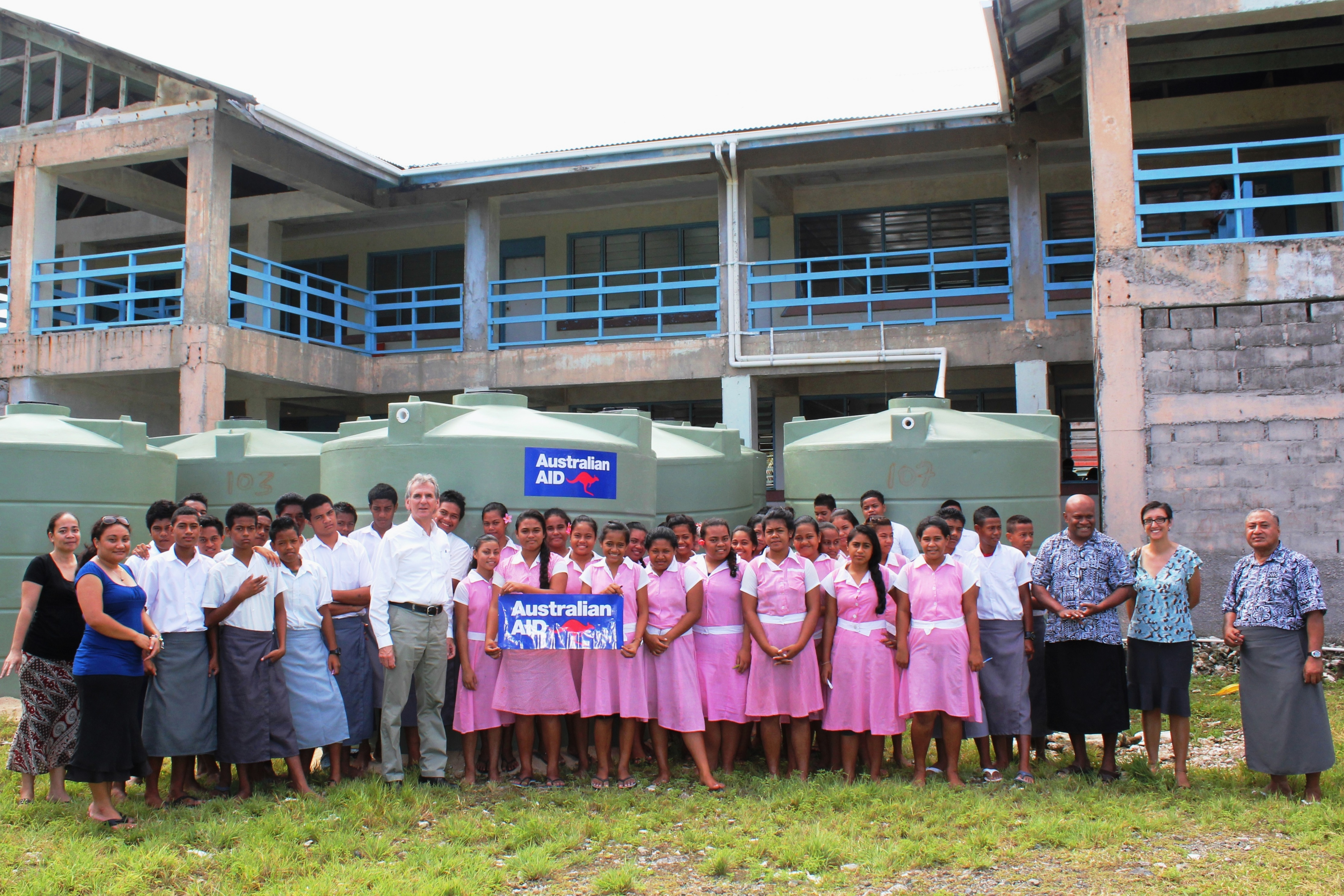

Location
- Funafuti; Tuvalu
- Coordinates: 8°28′45.77″S 179°11′32.19″E

Information
- Type: Day school
- Denomination: Church of Tuvalu
- Headmaster: Penehuro Hauma
- Teaching staff: 12 (2012)
- Gender: Co-educational
- Enrollment: 303 (2022)

Fetuvalu Secondary School is a day school in the Pacific island nation of Tuvalu that is operated by the Church of Tuvalu and is located on Funafuti atoll. The school re-opened in 2003 having been closed for 5 years; the school offered Form 3 and added Forms 4 to 6 in subsequent years.

From 2006, Fetuvalu offers the Cambridge syllabus. Fetuvalu follows a different curriculum to that provided by Motufoua Secondary School, which is the government school, although its education programmes are equivalent to those offered at Motufoua from Year 9 to Year 12. Fetuvalu students that want to attend university can proceed to Year 13 at the government's Form Seven programme or students can attend the foundation programme offered through the University of the South Pacific (USP) Extension Centre in Funafuti.
