= Islam in Tuvalu =

Islam is a minority religion in the island nation Tuvalu. With the introduction of Ahmadiyya religion in 1985 by Ahmadi, there are approximately 50 Muslims in the country, of which all are members of the Ahmadiyya movement. Due to the country's small population of 10,679, this represents 0.46% of Tuvalu. The Tuvalu Mosque, in Funafuti, the capital of Tuvalu, is the only mosque in the country.

== History ==
Islam was first introduced to the island nation by a British Ahmadi Muslim of Pakistani descent, Iftikhar A. Ayaz, who works as the British consular representative to Tuvalu Islands. In 1985, he came to Tuvalu, and in out of office hours, he endeavoured to introduce the Islamic faith to the local population. With several converts to the faith, Ayaz requested the headquarters of the Community in London to send a missionary to the Islands. As a result, Hafiz Jibrail, a Ghanaian missionary, who was already based in the South Pacific at the time, arrived in 1989, approximately four years after the introduction of Islam to the nation. However, in 1991, Hafiz Jibrail had to be transferred to the Kiribati Islands and thus was replaced by Abdul Ghaffar, another Ghanaian missionary to the Community. Nonetheless, having served the Islands for roughly 5 years, he returned to serve his home country, Ghana. After a lag of several years, during which the islands had no missionary, Abdul Hakeem Boateng, another Ghanaian missionary, arrived in 2003 and served there until 2009. Since 2009, Muhammad Idris, an Indonesian missionary to the Ahmadiyya Community, is now the current and first non-Ghanaian missionary to Tuvalu.

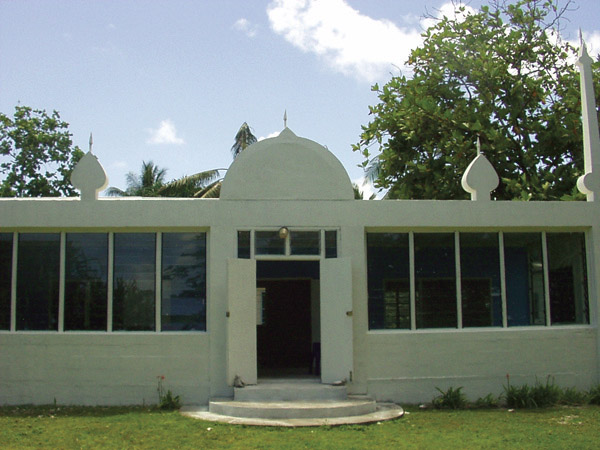

The Ahmadiyya Muslim Community translated the Quran into the Tuvaluan language in 1990. The Ahmaddiya Tuvalu mosque, first constructed in 1991, is the only mosque in the Islands.

== See also ==
- Religion in Tuvalu
- Funafuti Mosque
- History of Tuvalu
