= Fangaua =

- Island
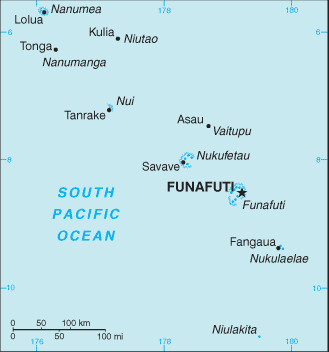
- Map of Tuvalu, showing major towns and islands.
- Coordinates: 9°22′12″S 179°48′31″E
- Country: Tuvalu
- Atoll: Nukulaelae
- Capital: Pepesala
- Village: Nukualofa

Area
  - Total: 0.277 km^{2} (0.107 sq mi)

Population (2017)
  - Total: 300
  - Density: 1,100/km^{2} (2,800/sq mi)
  - Summer (DST)

Fangaua is an islet of Nukulaelae Atoll, Tuvalu on which is Pepesala, the main village of Nukulaelae, with a population of 350 people (2020 census)The island has only two schools.
