= Demographics of Tuvalu =

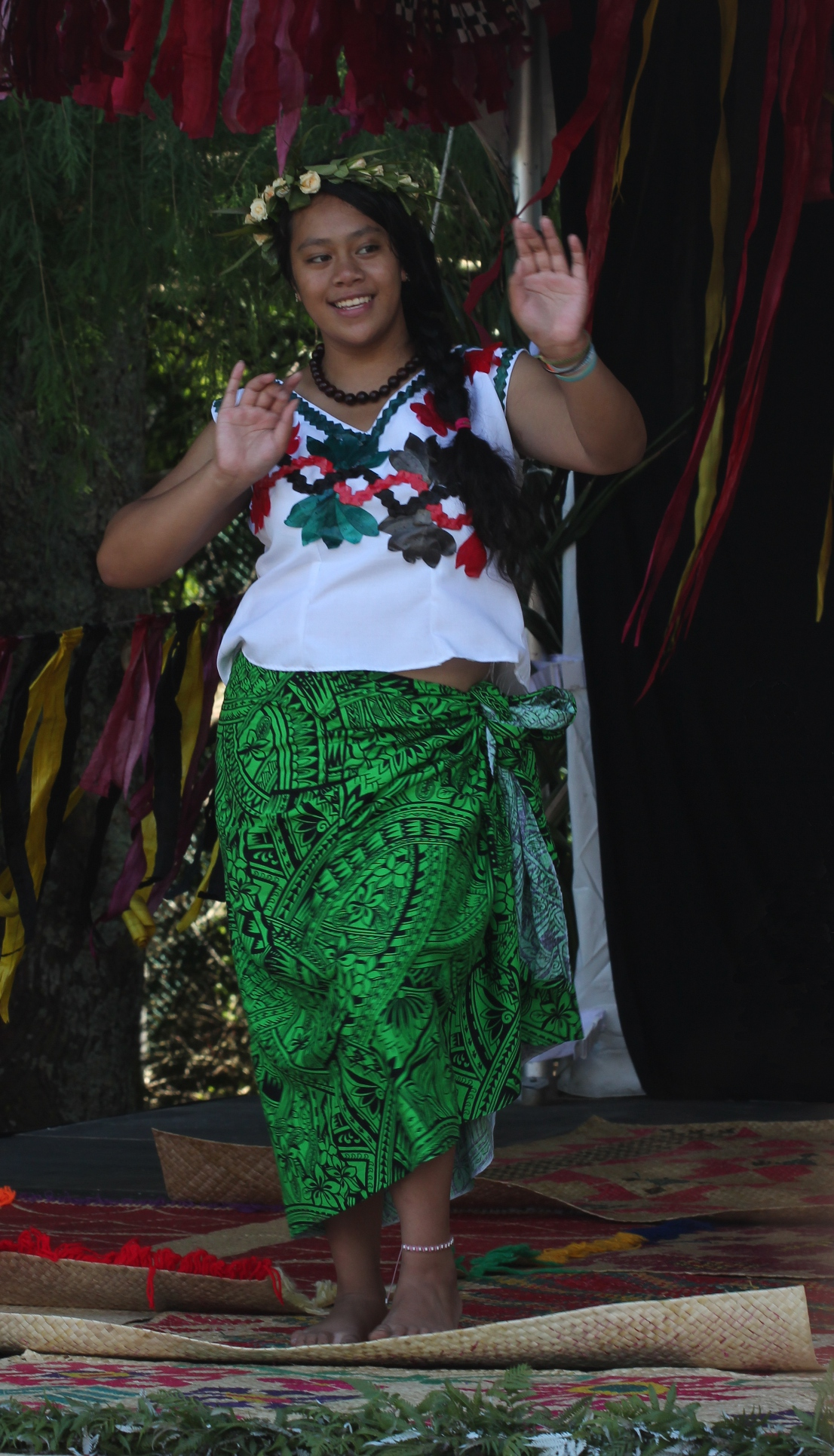
A Tuvaluan New Zealand dancer at Auckland's Pasifika Festival

Demographic features of the population of Tuvalu include the age structure, ethnicity, education level, life expectancy, religious affiliations and other aspects of the population.

== Summary ==
The population of Tuvalu is predominately of Polynesian ethnicity with approximately 5.6% of the population being Micronesian. Tuvaluans are ethnically related to the people of Samoa and Tonga. There is evidence for a dual genetic origin of Pacific Islanders in Asia and Melanesia, which results from an analysis of Y chromosome (NRY) and mitochondrial DNA (mtDNA) markers. There is also evidence of Fiji playing a pivotal role in west-to-east expansion within Polynesia. The pattern of settlement believed to have occurred is that the Polynesians spread out from the Samoan Islands into the Tuvaluan atolls, with Tuvalu providing a stepping stone to migration into the Polynesian Outlier communities in Melanesia and Micronesia.

The vast majority of Tuvaluans belong to the Church of Tuvalu, a Protestant denomination. Their ancestors were converted by Christian missionaries in the 19th century.

Infant mortality in Tuvalu was 25 deaths per 1,000 live births in 2012, with an under-five mortality rate of 30 deaths per 1,000 live births. There has been a consistent decline in the under-five mortality rate since 1990.

School attendance at school is 10 years for males and 11 years for females (2001). Adult literacy rate is 99.0% (2002).

- Primary school enrollment (2006): 100%
- Secondary school enrollment (2001): 79.5%

Life expectancy for women in Tuvalu is 68.41 years and 64.01 years for men (2015 est.).

The population of Tuvalu is recorded by the Central Statistics Department (CSD) of Tuvalu in the census information:

The net migration rate is estimated at -6.81 migrant(s)/1,000 population (2015 est.). The threat of global warming in Tuvalu is not a dominant motivation for migration as Tuvaluans appear to prefer to continue living on the islands for reasons of lifestyle, culture and identity.

The Census Monograph on Migration, Urbanization and Youth provides an analysis of the 2012 census and reported:

- A total of 1,200 people were listed as being out of country on census night with more males (57%) than females (43%) absent. The high proportion in range of ages 15 to 29 years (37% of the total) is described as indicating the significance of overseas tertiary education and training.

== Population ==
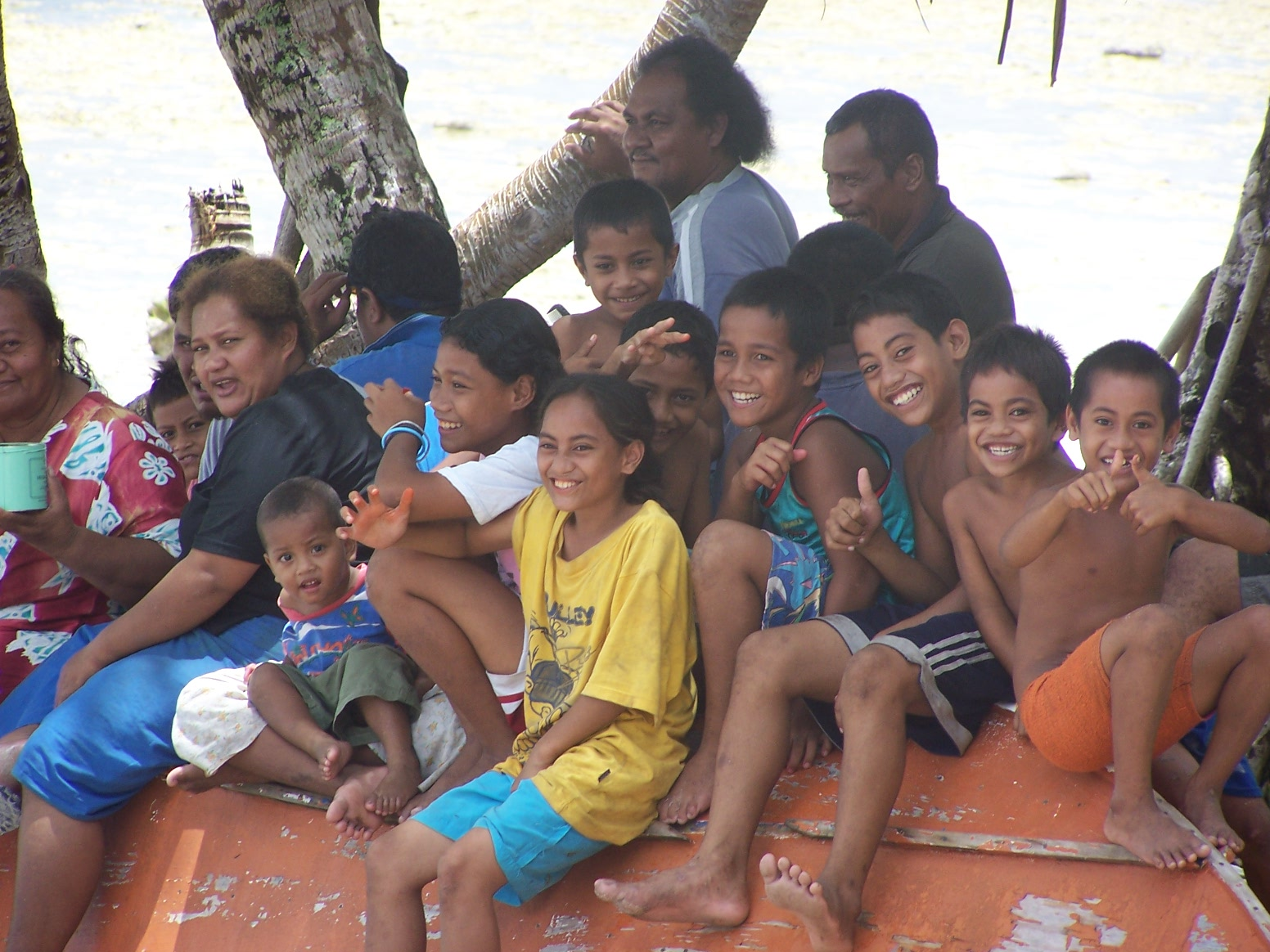
Children on Niutao

1979 Census	1985 Census	1991 Census	2002 Census	2012 Census	2017 Census	2022 Census
7,349	8,229	9,043	9,359	10,640	10,507	10,632

=== Structure of the population ===
Population by Sex and Age Group (Census 12.XI.2017) (Data of mini-census taken in 2017.):

Age group	Male	Female	Total	%
Total	5 488	5 157	10 645	100
0–4	625	535	1 160	10.90
5–9	628	577	1 205	11.32
10–14	541	471	1 012	9.51
15–19	499	454	953	8.95
20–24	482	458	940	8.83
25–29	502	421	923	8.67
30–34	407	362	769	7.22
35–39	299	280	579	5.44
40–44	242	212	454	4.26
45–49	251	227	478	4.49
50–54	314	272	586	5.50
55–59	257	322	579	5.44
60–64	198	223	421	3.95
65-69	117	155	272	2.56
70-74	64	72	136	1.28
75-79	41	58	99	0.93
80-84	16	43	59	0.55
85+	5	15	20	0.19
Age group	Male	Female	Total	Percent
0–14	1 794	1 583	3 377	31.72
15–64	3 451	3 231	6 682	62.77
65+	243	343	586	5.50

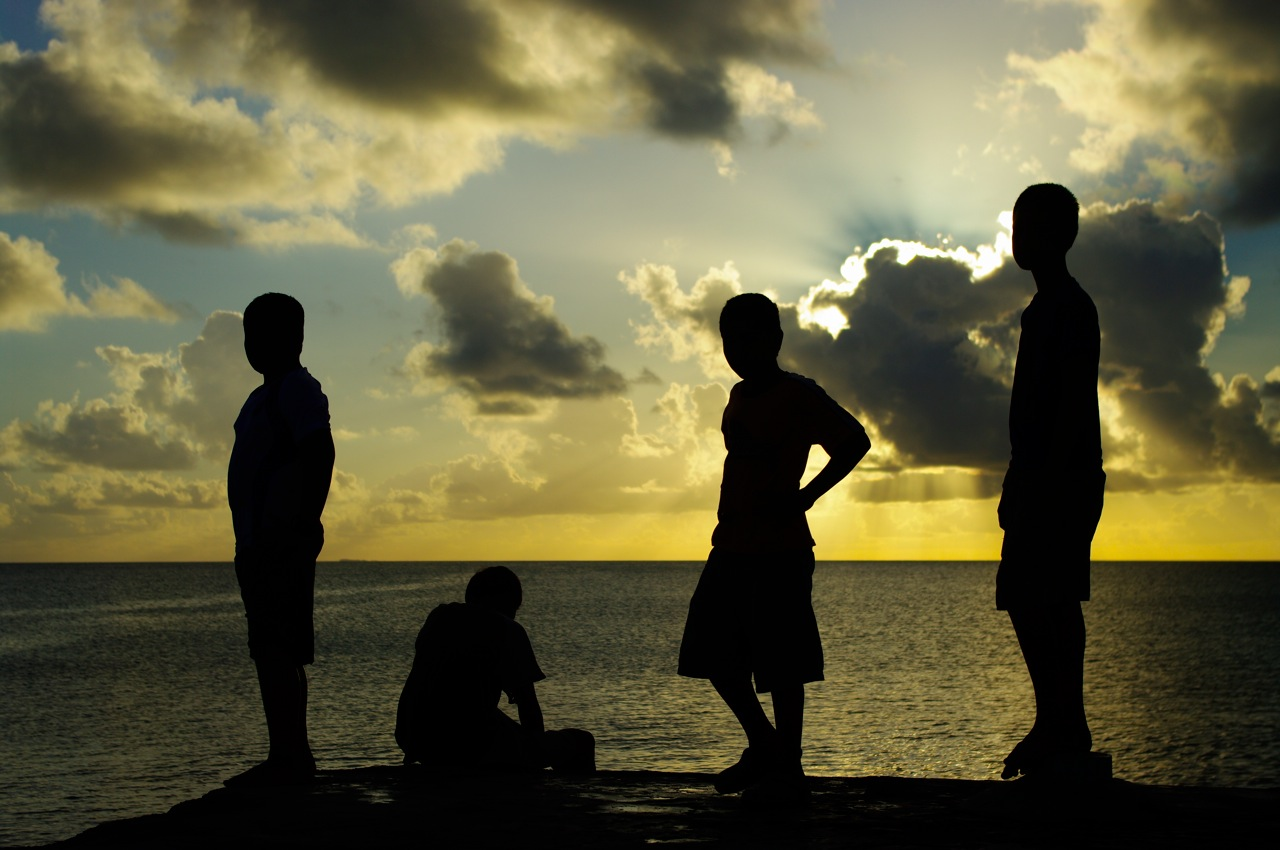
Children on a wharf at Funafuti lagoon

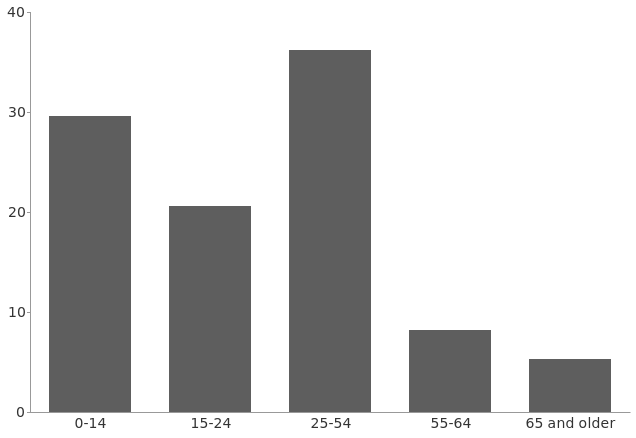
Population Distribution of Tuvalu by Age Group (2014)

== Vital statistics ==
=== Registered births and deaths ===
Year	Population	Live births	Deaths	Natural increase	Crude birth rate	Crude death rate	Rate of natural increase	TFR
2018	10,574	257	87	170	24.3	8.2	16.1	3.449
2019	10,273	256	140	116	24.9	13.6	11.3	3.420
2020	10,204	309	136	173	30.3	13.3	17.0	4.204
2021	10,280	279	112	167	27.1	10.9	16.2	3.867
2022	10,597	267	86	181	25.2	8.1	17.1	3.70
2023	10,099	235	128	107	23.3	12.7	10.6	3.302
2024	9,853	223	109	114	22.6	11.1	11.6	3.18
2025		184	85	99				

== Ethnic groups ==
From the 2022 census:

- Tuvaluan 94%
- Tuvaluan/I-Kiribati 4%
- Tuvaluan/other 1%
- Other 1%
- Not stated <1%

== Languages ==
- Tuvaluan (official)
- English (official)
- Samoan
- Ikiribati language (on the island of Nui)

== Religion ==
- Church of Tuvalu 86%
- Seventh-day Adventist Church 2%
- Baháʼí 1%
- all other faiths or denominations 10%
- not stated 1%

== Migration ==
=== Emigration ===
==== New Zealand ====
The 2013 Census of New Zealand reported 3,537 Tuvaluans, an increase of 80% from the 1,965 reported in the 2001 census. In the 2013 census, only about 40% (1,419) had been born in Tuvalu. The high proportion of Tuvaluans who are New Zealand born illustrates the significance of New Zealand as a long term destination for Tuvaluan migrants.

==== Australia ====
The Tuvaluan community in Australia is recorded in the 2011 Australian Census as 228 people who put Tuvaluan as their first response to a question on ‘ancestry’; of these 120 were born in Tuvalu. The islands of Nanumea, Nanumaga, Nukufetau and Niutao had relatively high net migration losses, with most being internal migrants to Funafuti. Vaitupu had the largest net migration gain, although this is attributed to the location of Motufoua Secondary School on Vaitupu and the movement of students from the other islands.

== See also ==
- Women in Tuvalu
- History of Tuvalu
- Religion in Tuvalu
- Geography of Tuvalu
- Princess Margaret Hospital
