= Elekana =

19th-century Polynesian minister

Elekana or Erikana was a Christian deacon in the London Missionary Society who brought Christianity to Tuvalu after being blown off course and travelling over 1,500 nautical miles from Manihiki to Nukulaelae in 1861. He was active in Tuvalu until being removed in 1870. Little else is known about his life.

== Personal life ==
Elekana or Erikana was from Manihiki. The date of birth and death of Elekana is unknown and most of his biographical details are disputed. Maretu, a missionary who arrived in the Cook Islands in 1839, made Elekana a deacon in the Cook Island London Missionary Society (LMS)

Elekana was the father of a son named Tavita. Tavita later worked as a Christian missionary before being murdered in the Gulf of Papua in 1887. Tavita's son Teina Materua was adopted by his missionary partner Ruatoka.

== Career ==
Initially travelling between Manihiki and Rakahanga, the canoe carrying Elekana, Tavita, Tuitolu, Parana, Ninoko, and Larilari was blown off course by a storm and traversed the ocean for eight weeks. On 10 May 1861, their canoe made shore on Matamotu, an islet of Nukulaelae, after travelling over 1,500 nautical miles.

Elekana started to proselytize to the Ellice Islands (now Tuvalu) and left to go for to the Malua Theological College in Samoa in order to properly minister as he was not ordained yet. He went to Funafuti on his way to Samoa and was well received. He received his training and reported to the LMS that he needed missionaries for these islands. Reverend A.W. Murray was assigned to go with Elekana in May 1865.

Murray and Elekana visited five islands Elekana converted around 300 people on Nukulaelae. The LMS replaced Elekana with Sapolu in 1870, due to Elekana interfering in local politics. Celebrations were conducted for the anniversary of Elekana's arrival in 1961 and 1986. As of 2020, there are 11,500 Christians in Tuvalu.

== Works cited ==
=== Books ===
- Besnier, Niko (2009). Gossip and the Everyday Production of Politics. University of Hawai'i Press. ISBN 9780824862695.
- Garrett, John (1982). To Live Among the Stars: Christian Origins in Oceania. University of the South Pacific. ISBN 2825406929.
- Ross, Kenneth; Tahaafe-Williams, Katalina; Johnson, Todd (2021). The Torrid Zone: Caribbean Colonization and Cultural Interaction in the Long Seventeenth Century. Edinburgh University Press. ISBN 9781474480109.

=== Journals ===
- Besnier, Niko (2016). "Humour and Humility: Narratives of Modernity on Nukulaelae Atoll". Etnofoor. 28 (1). Stichting Etnofoor: 75–95. doi:10.2307/43823943. JSTOR 43823943.
- Chambers, Keith; Chambers, Anne; Munro, Doug (1978). "Sapolu, S. Percy Smith and A Tale From Nanumea". The Journal of the Polynesian Society. 87 (1). Polynesian Society: 29–40. doi:10.2307/20705317. JSTOR 20705317.
- Goldsmith, Michael; Munro, Doug (1992). "Conversion and Church Formation in Tuvalu". The Journal of the Polynesian Society. 27 (1). Polynesian Society: 44–54. doi:10.2307/25169105. JSTOR 25169105.
- Goldsmith, Michael (2019). "Missionaries and other Emissaries of Colonialism In Tuvalu - Special issue: Religious Rupture and Revival in the Pacific". Journal of the Polynesian Society. 128:4: 457–474.
- Goldsmith, Michael (June 2008). Brij V. Lal, Vicki Luker (ed.). Telling Pacific Lives: Prisms of Process. University of Waikato. p. 122.
- Newton, W. (1967). "The Early Population of the Ellice Islands". The Journal of the Polynesian Society. 76 (2). Polynesian Society: 197–204. doi:10.2307/20704460. JSTOR 20704460.
- Roberts, R. (1958). "Te Atu Tuvalu: A Short History of the Ellice Islands". The Journal of the Polynesian Society. 67 (4). Polynesian Society: 394–423. doi:10.2307/20703694. JSTOR 20703694.
