= List of butterflies of Tuvalu =

Location of Tuvalu

This is a list of butterflies of Tuvalu.

== Lycaenidae ==
=== Polyommatinae ===
- Zizina labradus mangoensis (Butler, 1884)

== Nymphalidae ==
=== Danainae ===
- Danaus plexippus plexippus (Linnaeus, 1758)
- Euploea lewinii distincta (Butler, 1874)

=== Nymphalinae ===
- Hypolimnas bolina rarik von Eschscholtz, 1821
- Junonia villida villida (Fabricius, 1787)
