= Nukulaelae =

Atoll and one of nine districts of Tuvalu

- Atoll
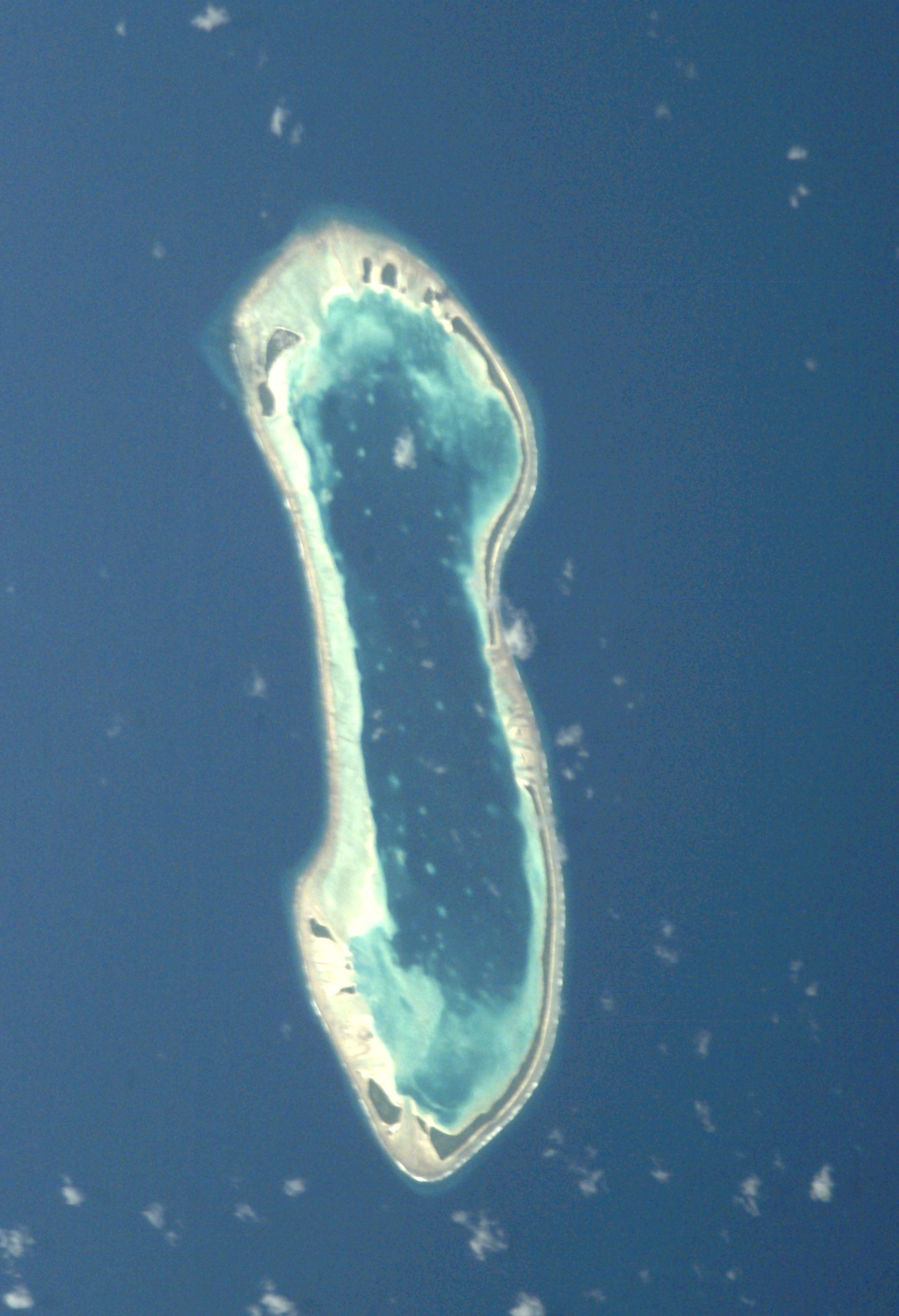
- Nukulaelae atoll from space

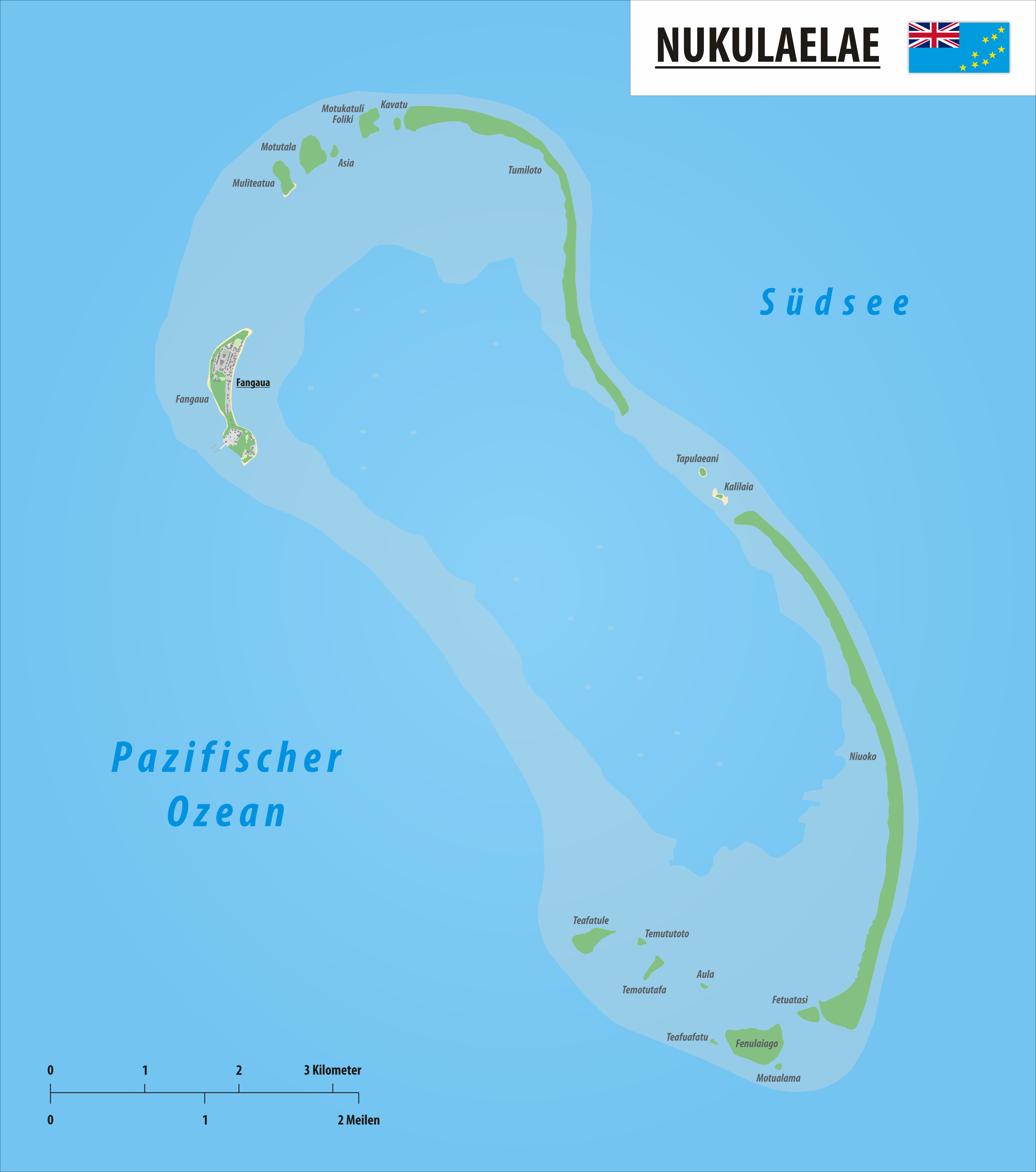
- Map of the atoll

- Location in Tuvalu
- Coordinates: 09°22′12″S 179°48′31″E
- Country: Tuvalu

Area
  - Total: 1.82 km^{2} (0.70 sq mi)

Population (2022)
  - Total: 641
  - Density: 352/km^{2} (912/sq mi)
- ISO 3166 code: TV-NKL

Nukulaelae is an atoll that is part of the nation of Tuvalu, and it has a population of 300 (2017 census). The largest settlement is Pepesala on Fangaua islet with a population of 341 people (2022 Census). It has the form of an oval and consists of at least 15 islets. The inhabited islet is Fangaua, which is 1.5 kilometres (0.93 mi) long and 50 to 200 metres (160 to 660 ft) wide. The easternmost point of Tuvalu is Niuoko islet. The Nukulaelae Conservation Area covers the eastern end of the lagoon. A baseline survey of marine life in the conservation zone was conducted in 2010.

== History ==
The traditional history of Nukulaelae is that a white-skinned man was the first person to sight the island, but he did not settle as there were no trees. Nukulaelae means 'the land of sands'. Later, according to tradition, Valoa from Vaitupu discovered Nukulaelae while on a fishing expedition. He returned to Nukulaelae and planted coconut trees and eventually settled on Nukulaelae with his family. On the islet of Tumuiloto was a malae named Fagafale where religious rites honouring ancestral spirits were practiced. On the islet of Niuoka is a large stone at a place called Te Faleatua - 'the house of the gods.'

In 1821 Nukulaelae was visited by Captain George Barrett of the Nantucket whaler Independence II He named the atoll ‘Mitchell’s Group’.

Christianity first came to Tuvalu in 1861 when Elekana, a deacon of a Congregational church in Manihiki, Cook Islands became caught in a storm and drifted for 8 weeks before landing at Nukulaelae on 10 May 1861.

The population of Nukulaelae in 1860 is estimated to be 300 people. For less than a year between 1862 and 1863, Peruvian ships, engaged in what came to be called the "blackbirding" trade, came to the islands seeking recruits to fill the extreme labour shortage in Peru, including workers to mine the guano deposits on the Chincha Islands. On Nukulaelae, the resident trader facilitated the recruiting of the islanders by the "blackbirders". About 200 were taken from Nukulaelae as immediately after 1863 there were fewer than 100 of the 300 recorded in 1861 as living on Nukulaelae.

Peter Laban was an early trader on Nukulaelae in the 1850s, followed by Tom Rose in the 1860s, and later Richard Collins in the 1890s. In 1865 a trading captain acting on behalf of the German firm of J.C. Godeffroy & Sohn obtained a 25-year lease to the eastern islet of Niuoko. For many years the islanders and the Germans argued over the lease, including its terms and the importation of labourers, however the Germans remained until the lease expired in 1890.

In 1896, HMS Penguin spent two days at Nukulaelae carrying out a scientific survey of the atoll.

Nukulaelae Post Office opened around 1923.

The atoll was claimed by the United States under the Guano Islands Act from the 19th century until 1983, when claims to the atoll were ceded to Tuvalu.

== Politics ==
No candidates contested the sitting MPs Seve Paeniu and Namoliki Sualiki in the 2024 general election that was held on 26 January 2024, so they were automatically returned to parliament.

== Education ==
The junior school is Faikimua Primary School.

== Notable local people ==
- Henry Faati Naisali (12 August 1928 – 29 October 2004) AO, CMG, MBE, was appointed Financial Secretary of the British Colony of Tuvalu in 1976. He was elected to represent Nukulaelae in the House of Assembly of the British Colony of Tuvalu in 1977. Naisali was elected to the Parliament of Tuvalu in 1981. He served as Deputy Prime Minister and Minister of Finance of Tuvalu (1985–1989), Secretary General of the Pacific Islands Forum (1988–1992). Naisali was the Director of the South Pacific Bureau for Economic Co-operation from January 1986 to September 1988.
- Bikenibeu Paeniu (born 10 May 1956) represented Nukulaelae in the Parliament of Tuvalu from 1989 to 2006 and served two terms as Prime Minister of Tuvalu (1989–1993) & (1996–1999).

== See also ==
- List of Guano Island claims
