= Coral reefs of Tuvalu =

List of coral reefs in Tuvalu

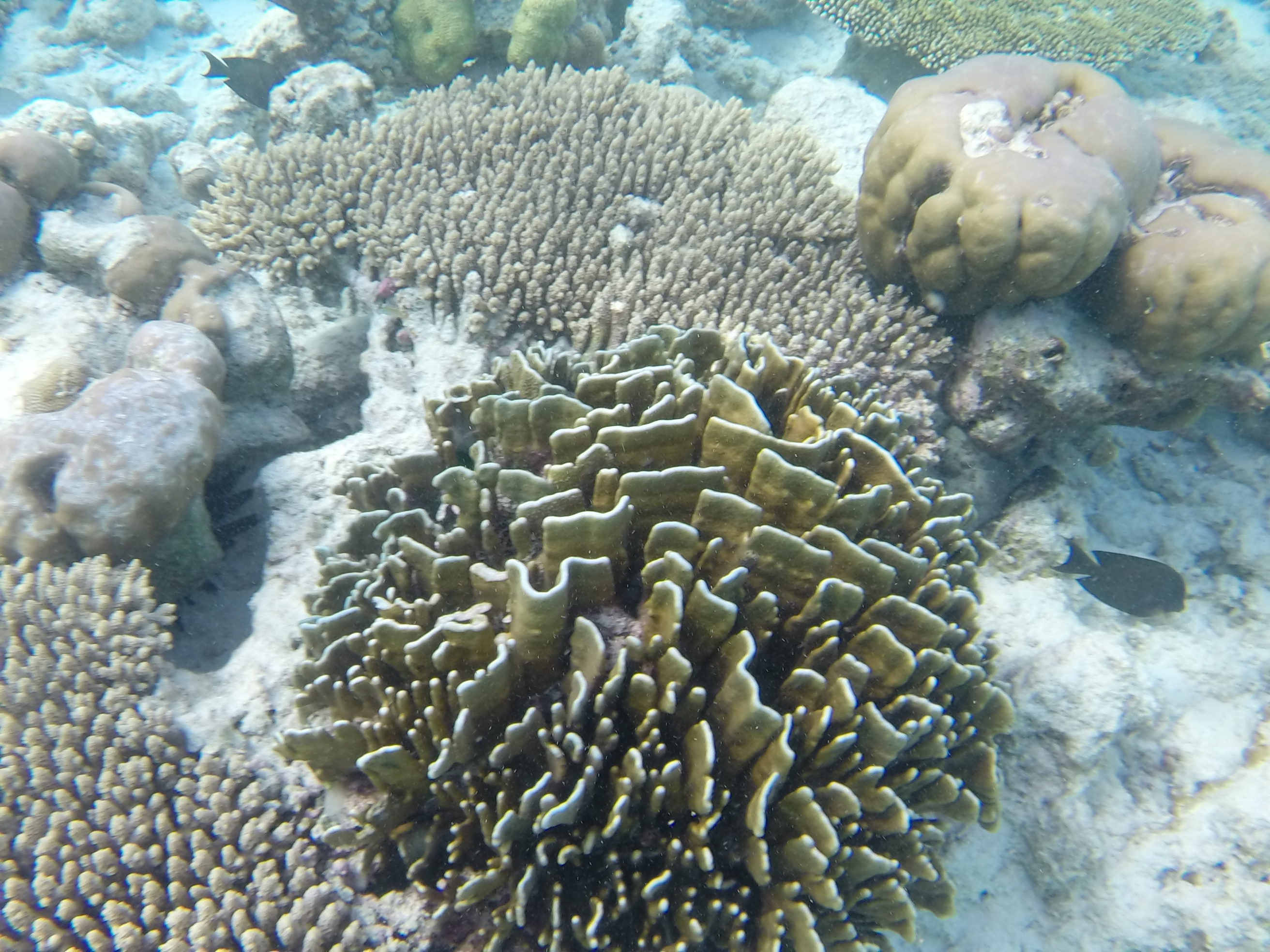
- Blue coral (Heliopora coerulea)

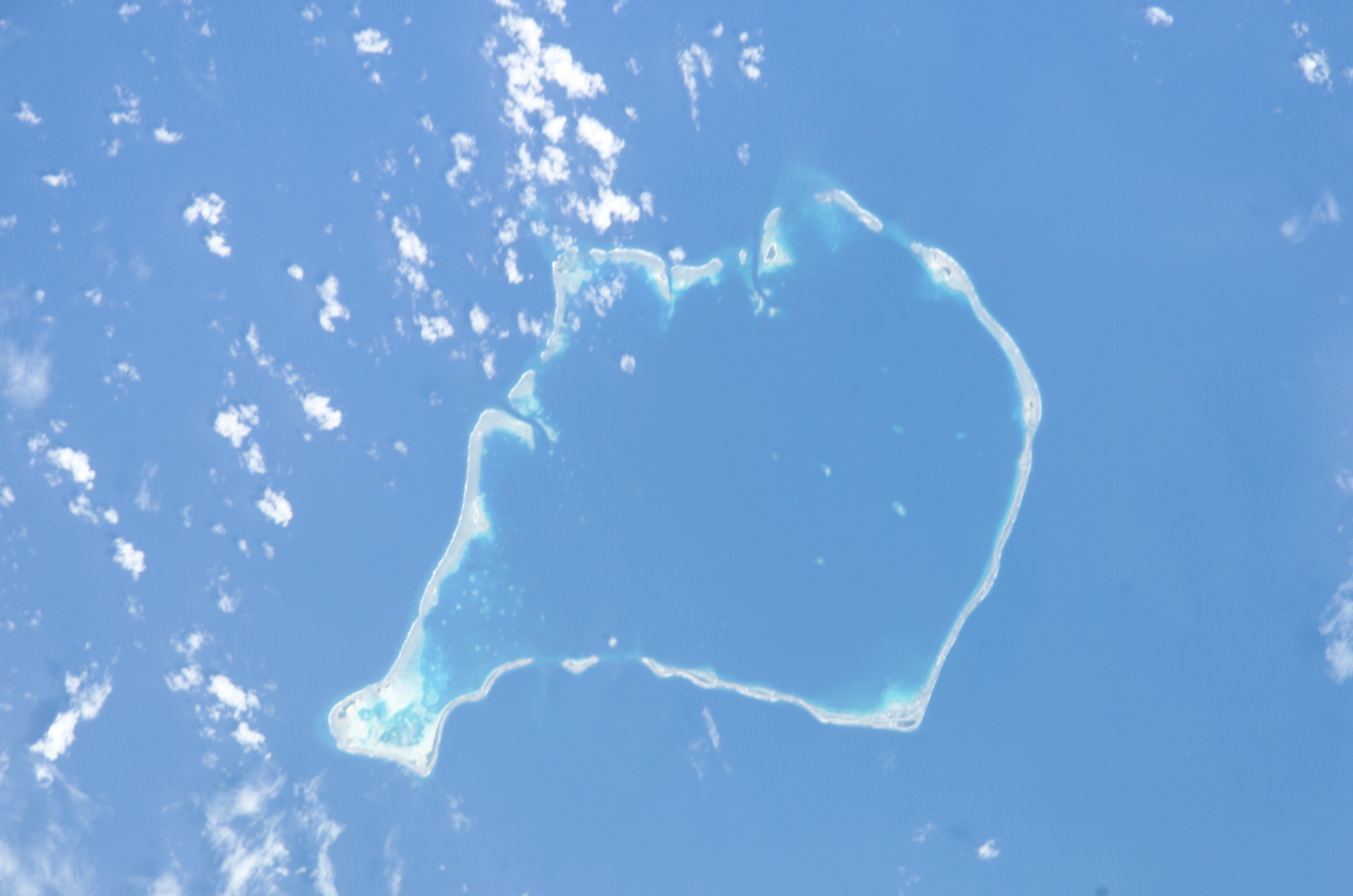
- Aerial image of Funafuti atoll

Geography
- Location: Pacific Ocean
- Coordinates: 5°41′S 176°12′E to 10°45′S 179°51′E
- Total islands: 9
- Major islands: Funafuti, Nanumanga, Nanumea, Niulakita, Niutao, Nui, Nukufetau, Nukulaelae and Vaitupu
- Area: 710 km^{2} (270 sq mi)

Administration
- Tuvalu

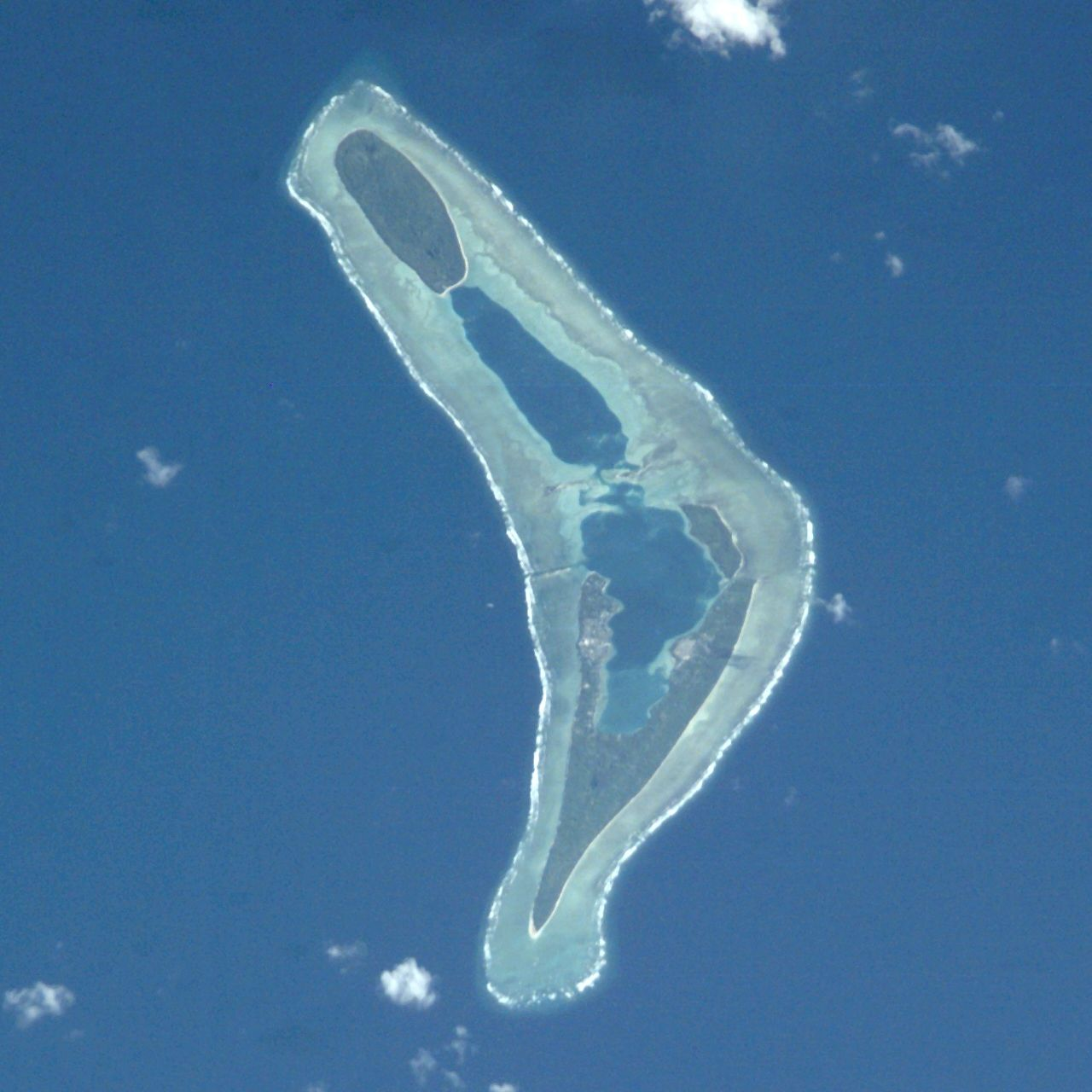
The atoll of Nanumea

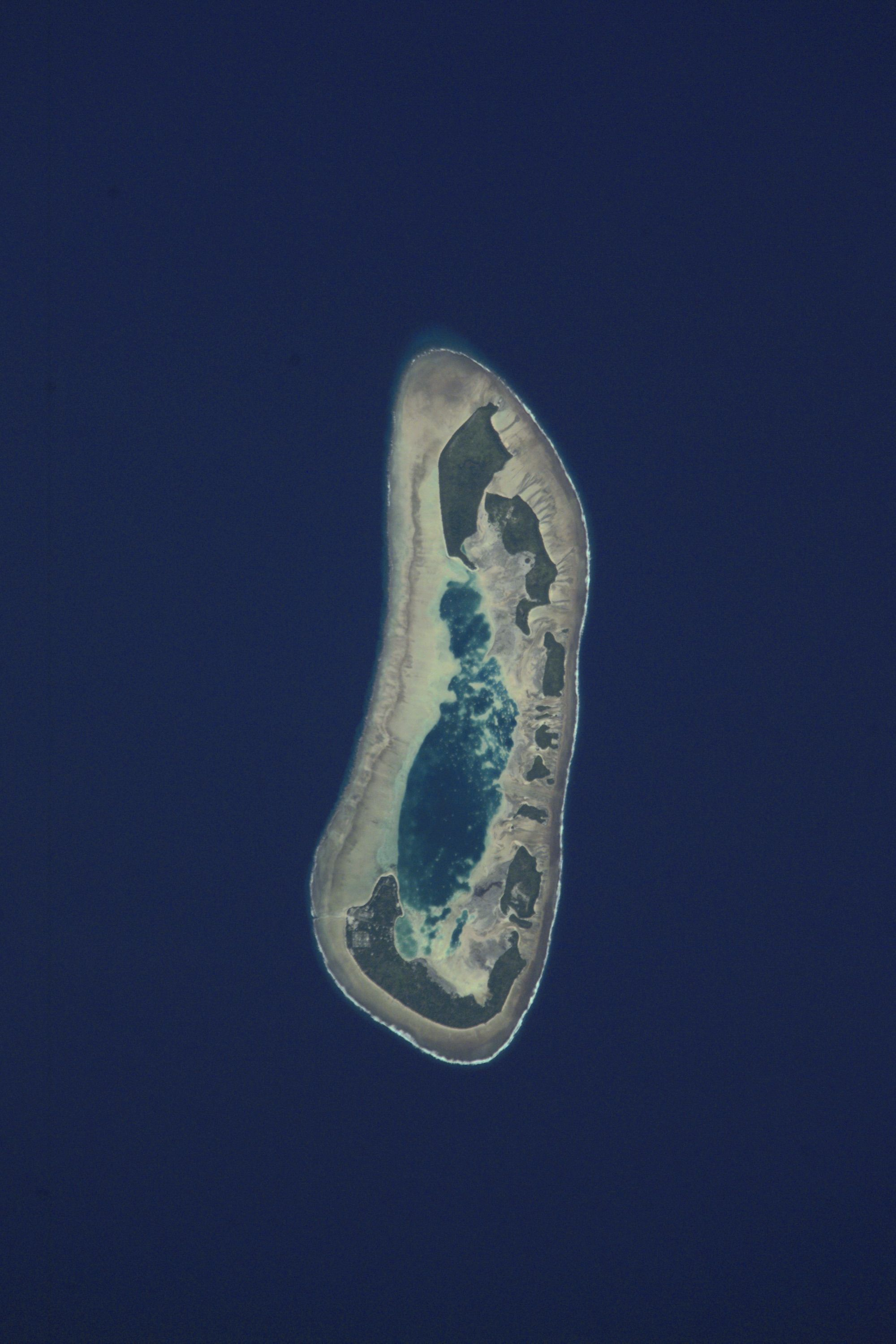
The atoll of Nui

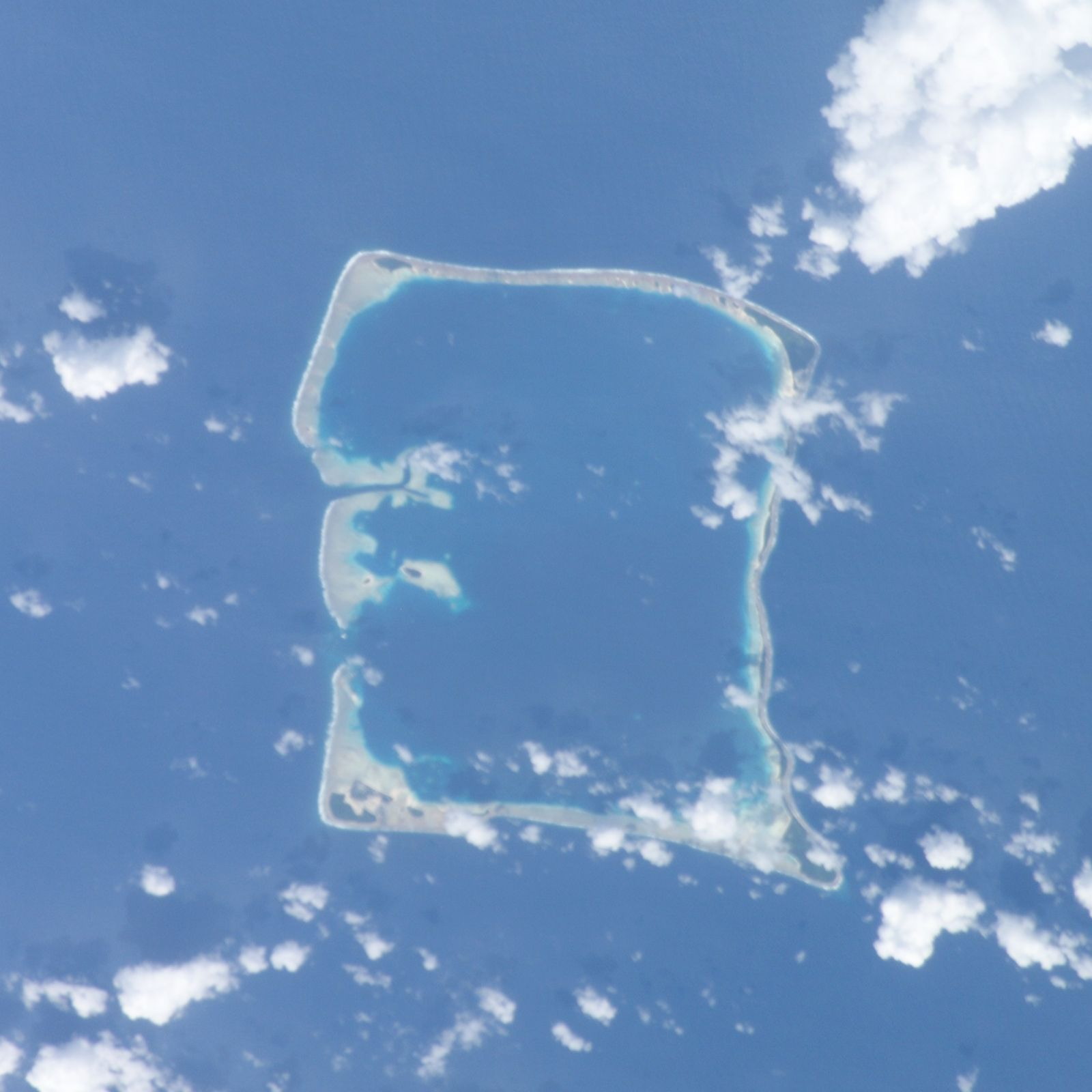
The atoll of Nukufetau

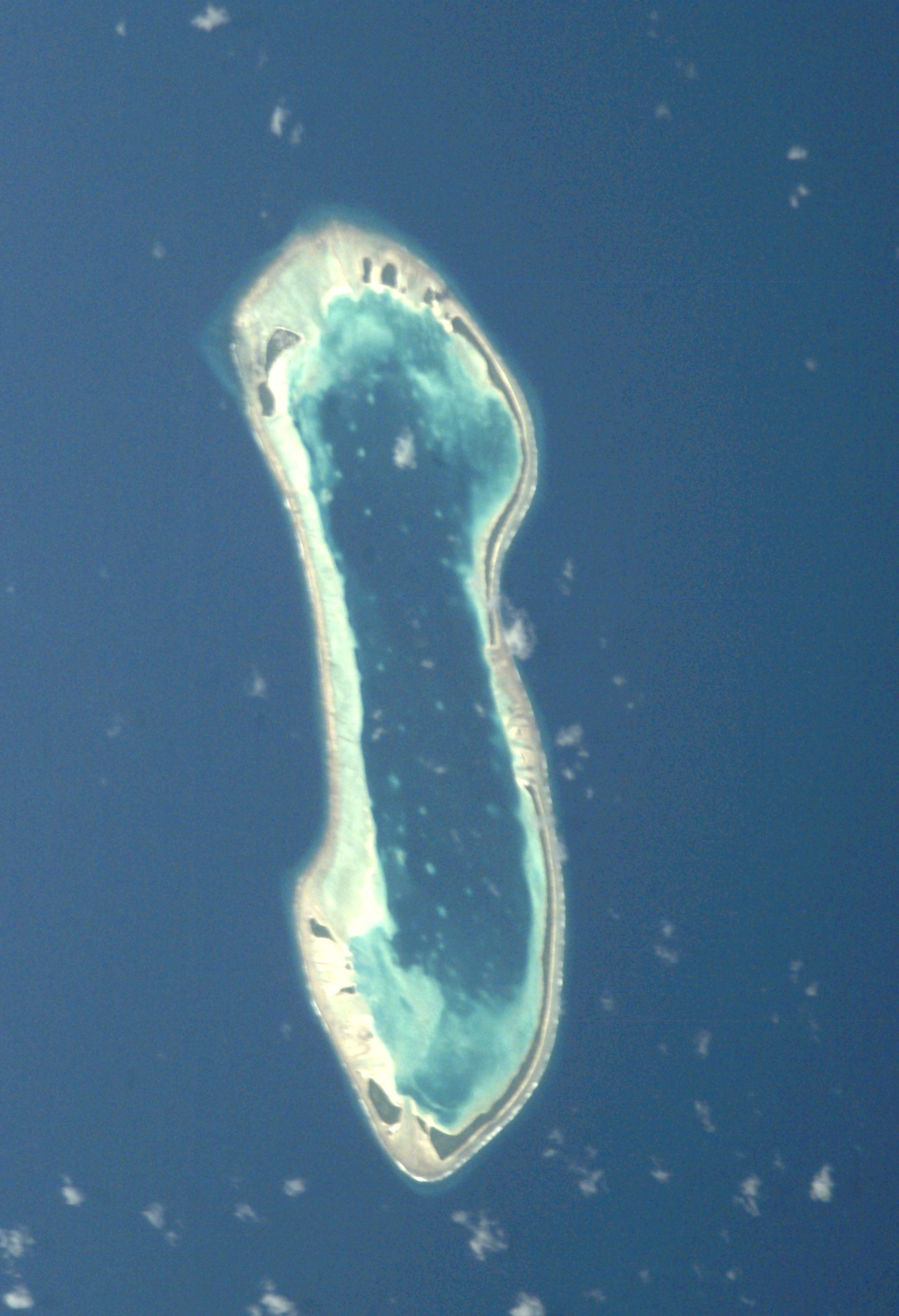
The atoll of Nukulaelae

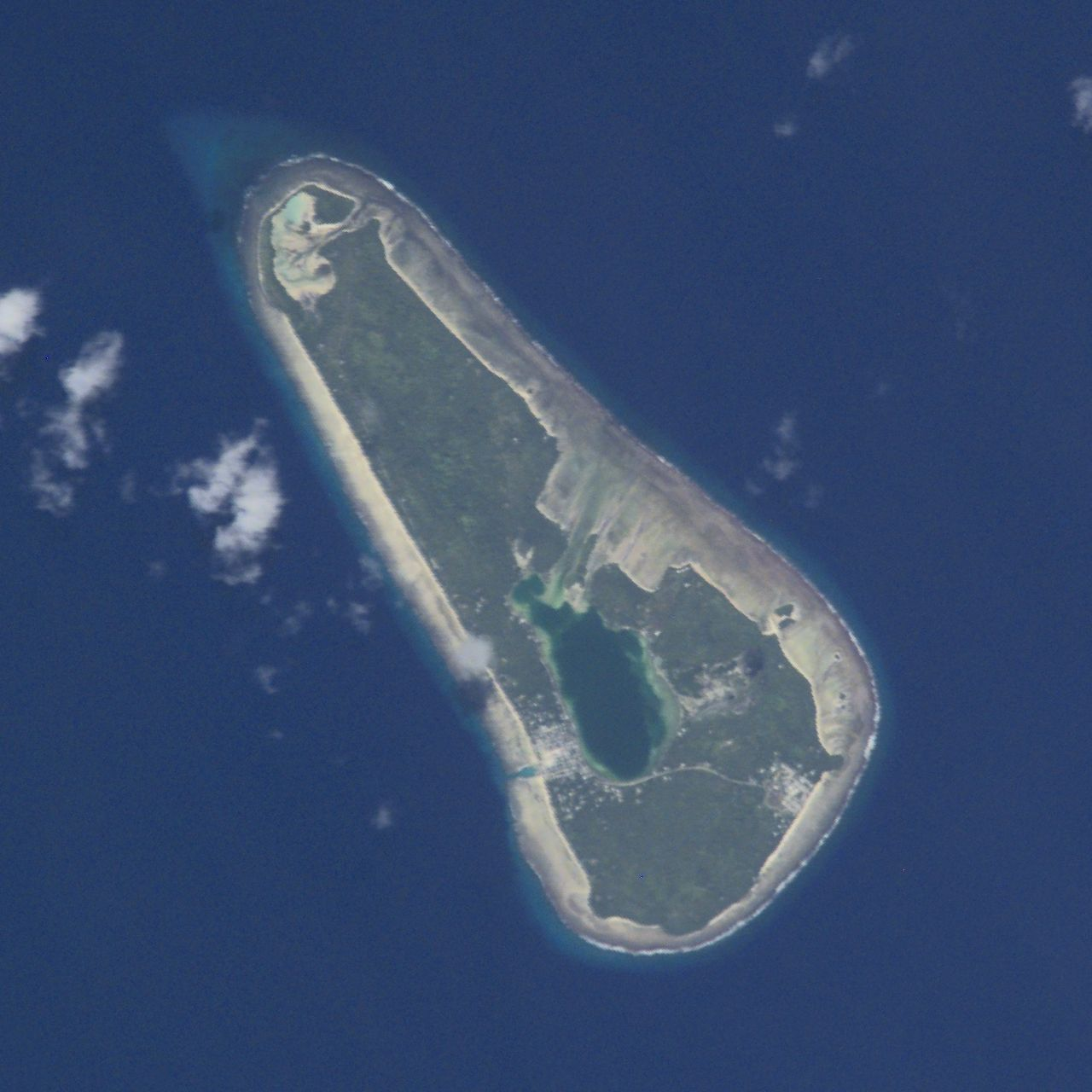
The atoll of Vaitupu

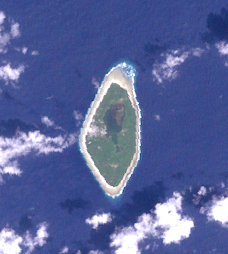
The reef island of Nanumanga

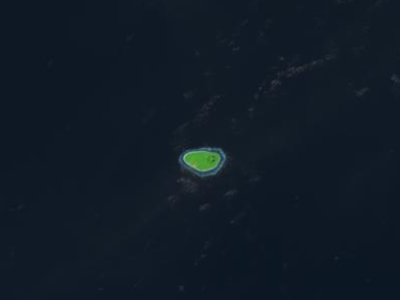
The reef island of Niulakita

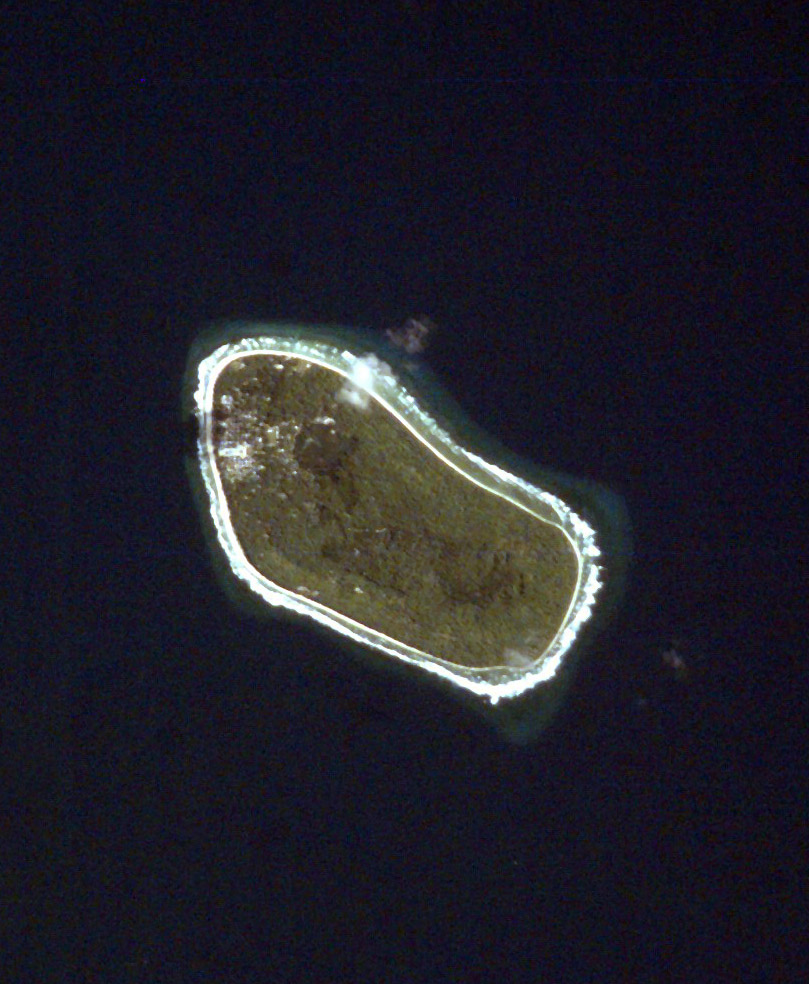
The reef island of Niutao

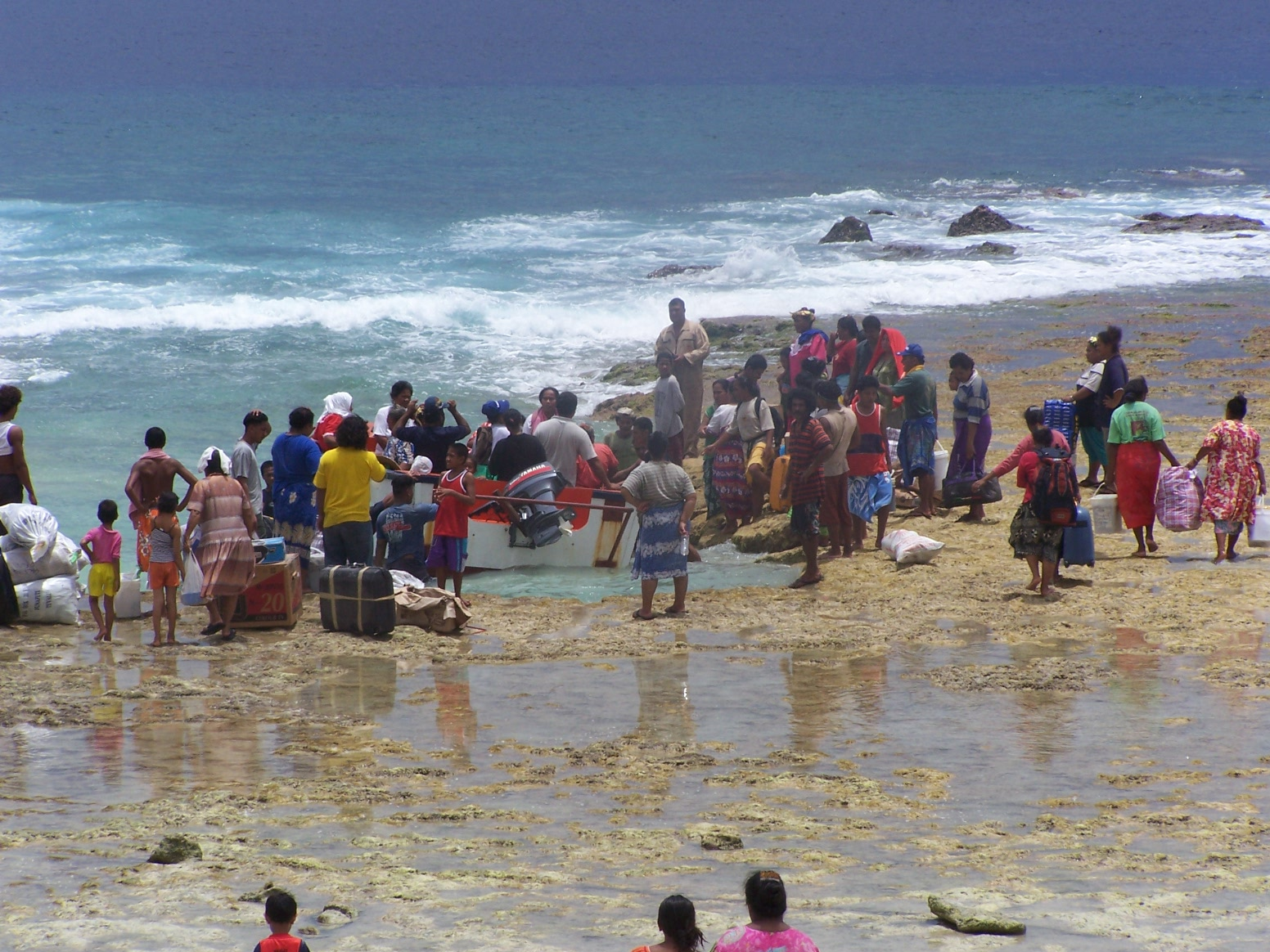
Landing cargo on the reef at Niutao (2006)

The coral reefs of Tuvalu consist of three reef islands and six atolls, containing approximately 710 km^{2} (270 mi^{2}) of reef platforms. The islands of the Tuvalu archipelago are spread out between the latitude of 5° to 10° south and longitude of 176° to 180°, west of the International Date Line. The islands of Tuvalu are volcanic in origin. On the atolls, an annular reef rim surrounds the lagoon, and may include natural reef channels. The reef islands have a different structure to the atolls, and are described as reef platforms as they are smaller tabular reef platforms that do not have a salt-water lagoon, although they may have a completely closed rim of dry land, with the remnants of a lagoon that has no direct connection to the open sea or that may be drying up.

== Structure of the reefs of Tuvalu ==
The islands of the Tuvalu archipelago are very low-lying, with the highest elevation of 4.6 metres (15 ft) above mean sea level on Niulakita. The atolls and reef islands of Tuvalu have been formed from oceanic volcanos, with a coral reef growing around the shore of the volcano and then, over several million years, the volcano becomes extinct, eroded and subsided completely beneath the surface of the ocean. The reef and the small coral islets on top of it are all that is left of the original island, and a lagoon has taken the place of the former volcano. For the atoll to persist, the coral reef must be maintained at the sea surface, with coral growth matching any relative change in sea level (subsidence of the island or rising oceans).

The boreholes on Fongafale islet, at the site now called Darwin's Drill, are the result of drilling conducted by the Royal Society of London for the purpose of investigating the formation of coral reefs to determine whether traces of shallow water organisms could be found at depth in the coral of Pacific atolls. This investigation followed the work on The Structure and Distribution of Coral Reefs conducted by Charles Darwin in the Pacific. Drilling occurred in 1896, 1897 and 1898. However, the geologic history of atolls is more complex than Darwin (1842) and Davis (1928) envisioned. The survey of Funafuti atoll published in 1970 described its structure as being:

“Funafuti is an almost circular and conical submarine mountain 12,000 feet high, originally volcanic, and of immense geological age, much older than the relatively young and active mountains of the New Hebrides and Solomons. At its base on the ocean bed it is 30 miles wide in one of the directions tested, and 28 miles wide on the other. It rises in a gentle slope which gradually steepens to a point 2,400 feet below water level, after which it rises at an angle of 80 degrees to 840 feet below water level. From this point it rises vertically, like an enormous pillar, till reaches the surface in the form of a reef enclosing a lagoon of irregular size, but of which the extremities give a measurement of 13.5 by 10.0 miles".

Funafuti, Nanumea, Nui, Nukufetau, Nukulaelae and Vaitupu are atolls (sometimes known as a coral atolls), which have a coral reef, which is a coral rim that encircles a lagoon partially or completely, with coral islands or islets (motu) on the rim.

Nanumanga, Niulakita and Niutao have a fringing reef in that they have either a shallow backreef zone (lagoon) or none at all. If a fringing reef grows directly from the shoreline, then the reef flat extends to the beach and there is no backreef. Although they have a completely closed rim of dry land, these reef islands can have the remnants of lagoons that has no connection to the open sea and are lakes, which are brackish to saline due to some connection with the ocean as the consequence of the porous nature of the limestone base of the islands. For example, Niutao has two lakes, which are brackish to saline; and are the degraded lagoon as the result of coral debris filling the lagoon.

Over a long period of time the reefs produce coral sand, which is a collection of sand of particles from the bioerosion of limestone skeletal material of marine organisms. One example of this process is that of Green humphead parrotfish, taona (Bulbometopon muricatum) and other species of parrot fish (ulafi, laea, kamutu) which bite off pieces of coral, digest the living tissue, and excrete the inorganic component as sand. However, the term "coral" in coral sand is used loosely in this sense to mean limestone of recent biological origin; corals are not the dominant contributors of sand particles to most such deposits. Rather, remnant skeletal fragments of foraminifera, calcareous algae, molluscs, and crustaceans can predominate. In Tuvalu the sand that has accumulated in lagoons or at the edges of the reefs, has been used for coastal protection and land reclamation projects.

Over four decades, there had been a net increase in land area of all 101 Tuvaluan islands or islets of 73.5 ha (2.9%), although the changes are not uniform, with 74% increasing and 27% decreasing in size. The sea level at the Funafuti tide gauge has risen at 3.9 mm per year, which is approximately twice the global average. The rising sea levels are identified as creating an increased transfer of wave energy across reef surfaces, which shifts sand, resulting in accretion to island shorelines.

== State of the reefs of Tuvalu ==
=== Surveys of the reefs ===
The results of Job and Ceccarelli's 2010 survey were published as the Tuvalu Marine Life Scientific Report in 2012. showed that the mean hard coral cover of Funafuti, Nanumea and Nukulaelae were 15%, 11% and 6%, respectively. with Funafuti having a higher mean coral cover, which was attributed to better water flow through the large reef passes (ava) and greater habitat diversity due to it large size, however, the coral cover in Funafuti was highly variable, ranging from 0.1% to 58%, with a mean cover of 15% across all sites that were surveyed.

Live coral cover (LCC) of hard coral was reported to be 19.5% across all reef habitats of Funafuti in 2004.

The surveying of the LCC levels across Funafuti, Nanumea and Nukulaelae by Job and Ceccarelli in 2010 established an average of 20-30% LCC level across the three islands; as compared to 30-70% LCC levels across reefs in Kiribati, which is to the north-west of Tuvalu. The standard criteria for coral reef health define a LCC level of less than 24.5% as being low indicating that the reef habitats of Funafuti, Nanumea and Nukulaelae reefs are in poor health.

Surveys conducted on Funafuti, Nanumea and Nanumaga, which were reported in 2020, focused on locations close the main settlements on those islands, as the surveys were in relation to proposals to carry out coastal protection and land reclamation projects. The results of the survey conducted on Nanumea established that there was a lower percentage of live coral cover at the existing boat ramp as compared to the reference site away from the village. The mean percentage LCC was assessed in terms of reef flat, reef crest and reef slope. The LCC levels for the reef flat at the boat channel site is 0%, at the reef crest was 1% and on the reef slope was 12.5%. At the reference site, LCC levels on the reef flat was also 0% with 10% on the reef crest and 8.5% on the reef slope.

The distribution of coral cover at the Nanumaga boat channel showed an increasing percent of LCC levels with increasing distance from the shore across the reef flat, reef crest and reef slope. Only three corals of families (Merulinidae, Pocilloporidae and Poritidae) were recorded at the boat channel, while at the reference site, over seven families were recorded. No macroalgae (seaweed) was recorded at the boat channel site but was present at the reference site. Macroalgae species recorded included red filamentous and brown encrusting algae (Caulerpa racemosa, Halimeda sp., Dictyota covernosa and Padina sp.).

Nanumea has between 20 and 30% LCC levels and the results of the 2010 surveys by Job and Ceccarelli indicated that Nanumea has a higher percentage of live coral cover than Nanumaga. The survey did confirm that Nanumea has the highest and richest coral community of the three islands covered. The survey also supports the studies undertaken at other atolls, which, suggesting higher levels of nutrients in the water due to sewage increases the density of seaweed cover, which inhibits the growth of coral. No sewage treatment systems exist in Tuvalu so that sewage enters the ocean and lagoon directly or through seepage from the freshwater lens as the result of sewage pits that leak into the watertable.

Crown-of-thorns starfish (Acanthaster planci) and other coral predators, such as the corallivorous snails Drupella spp., are found on the reefs of Tuvalu, although there has not been any indication of destructive outbreaks of those predators on the reefs.

Giant clams (Tridacnidae) have declined through the effects of increasing human populations, pollution, habitat destruction and harvesting. Coral reef invertebrates that are either edible or used in handicrafts exist at low densities, indicative of the high level of harvesting of those species. The women of Tuvalu use Cypraeidae (cowrie, pule) such as Cypraea mauritiana, C. arabica, C. tigris, C. depressa, C. mapa, C. carneola, C. vitellus, C. lynx and other shells harvested from the reefs in traditional handicrafts, which includes creating shell necklaces (tui misa or tui pule) and the decoration of mats, fans and wall hangings.

=== Impact of the main settlement on Funafuti atoll on the adjacent reef and lagoon ===
Funafuti is the largest atoll of the Tuvalu archipelago and comprises numerous islets around a central lagoon that is approximately 25.1 kilometres (15.6 miles) (N–S) by 18.4 kilometres (11.4 miles) (W-E), centred on 179°7'E and 8°30'S. There are a number of large reef passes (ava) through the reef, which results in flushing of the lagoon. A survey at the southern end of Fongafale islet in 1999 & 2000 recorded that live coral cover was in the order of 50+% LCC levels on the reef slope, with Acropora robusta the dominant form.

The 2007 baseline report for the Funafuti Atoll Coral Reef Restoration Project in the lagoon off Fongafale reported on the transplanting of common and locally abundant Acropora spp staghorn branching corals (principally Acropora robusta and Acropora formosa, with a low number of Acropora grandis colonies) from the fringing reef out to open sandy areas, in which habitat a few similar naturally occurring coral patches were present. Another common species Acropora florida, was also noted to be present on the fringing reef. The protected blue coral Heliopora coerulea was reported as being present in shallow habitats of Funafuti lagoon. The 2007 baseline report also recorded that the most common algae species included: Asparagopsis taxiformis; Caulerpa sertularioides; Caulerpa racemosa; Halimeda cf gracilis; Dictyota canaliculata; Enteromorpha spp; Microdictyon cf umbilicatum; and Padina sanctae-crucis.

LCC levels appear to have been stable at an average of 20%–30% between 1997 and 2004 (Lovell et al., 2004), and was reported to be 19.5% across all reef habitats of Funafuti in 2004 (Sauni et al., 2008). The 2010 surveys by Job and Ceccarelli identify that the coral cover on the reefs of Funafuti are highly variable, ranging from 0.1% to 58% LCC levels, with a mean cover of 15% across all sites. The highest coral cover estimates were recorded on reef slopes off the islets of Tepuka (58%), Fualefeke (35%) and Fuafatu (34%). The coral cover on the reefs at Funafuti appears to have declined since 2004.

The 2010 surveys by Job and Ceccarelli established that on islets to the south of the lagoon, coral cover was greater than 50% on the reef slope. In contrast, in the lagoon adjacent to Fogafale, 96% of the area has less than 1% LCC, and 3.7% has 1-5% LCC. The offshore reefs adjacent to Fogafale most (91%) have less than 1% LCC levels, with 5% of the reef with 1-5% LCC levels and 4% with 5-20% LCC level. On Funafuti atoll, the reef close to the main settlement on Fongafale islet has been degraded, as compared to the results from previous surveys, with higher levels of algal cover in contrast to other areas of the Funafuti lagoon which have high percentages of live coral cover.

Beginning in 2011, the non-native brown seaweed (Sargassum polycystum) has rapidly spread in Funafuti lagoon especially adjacent to Fongafale. It has responded to nutrient enrichment in the lagoon in the vicinity of Fofafale and its dense coverage has reduced sunlight penetrating to the reef and it out competes corals and makes fishing difficult. It is suspected that it was introduced through ballast water, or on ships’ hulls or anchors.

A survey in June 2014, recorded that LCC levels on the reef off Fongafale were dramatically lower than those recorded in previous surveys, with only around a 1% LCC level, consisting of a few clumps of Pocillopora damicornis, Acropora hyacinthus, Acropora cytherea, Acropora florida and some Acropora robusta. Most of the reef area was covered in turfing algae, with a mixture of Halimeda sp., Dictyota covernosa and Hypnea). The shallow waters were dominated by either Turbinaria or a turfing form of the Sargassum. The dramatic fall in LCC levels and the domination of the reef areas adjacent to Fogafale by varieties of algae is identified as the consequence of sewage from this densely populated islet. The consequence of this fall in LCC levels would be that production of corals and Foraminifera (that create sand) are reduced in the reef surrounding Fogafale, with a related reduction in natural breakwater functions of the reef and transportation of sand from the ocean to the lagoon.

=== Bleaching ===
In 2000, there was an average of 70% bleaching of the Staghorn (Acropora spp.) corals in Funafuti lagoon, when water temperatures were 30.5 °C to 32 °C. The bleaching was a consequence of an increase in ocean temperatures that happened during the El Niños that occurred between 1998 and 2001.

Bleaching is a process that expels the photosynthetic algae from the corals' "stomachs" or polyps. This algae is called zooxanthellae. It is vital to the reef's life because it provides the coral with nutrients; it is also responsible for the color. The process is called bleaching because when the algae is ejected from the coral reef the animal loses its pigment. Zooxanthella densities are continually changing; bleaching is an extreme example of what naturally happens.

A reef restoration project has investigated reef restoration techniques; and researchers from Japan have investigated rebuilding the coral reefs through the introduction of foraminifera. The project of the Japan International Cooperation Agency is designed to increase the resilience of the Tuvalu coast against sea level rise, through ecosystem rehabilitation and regeneration and through support for sand production.

== Marine protected areas ==
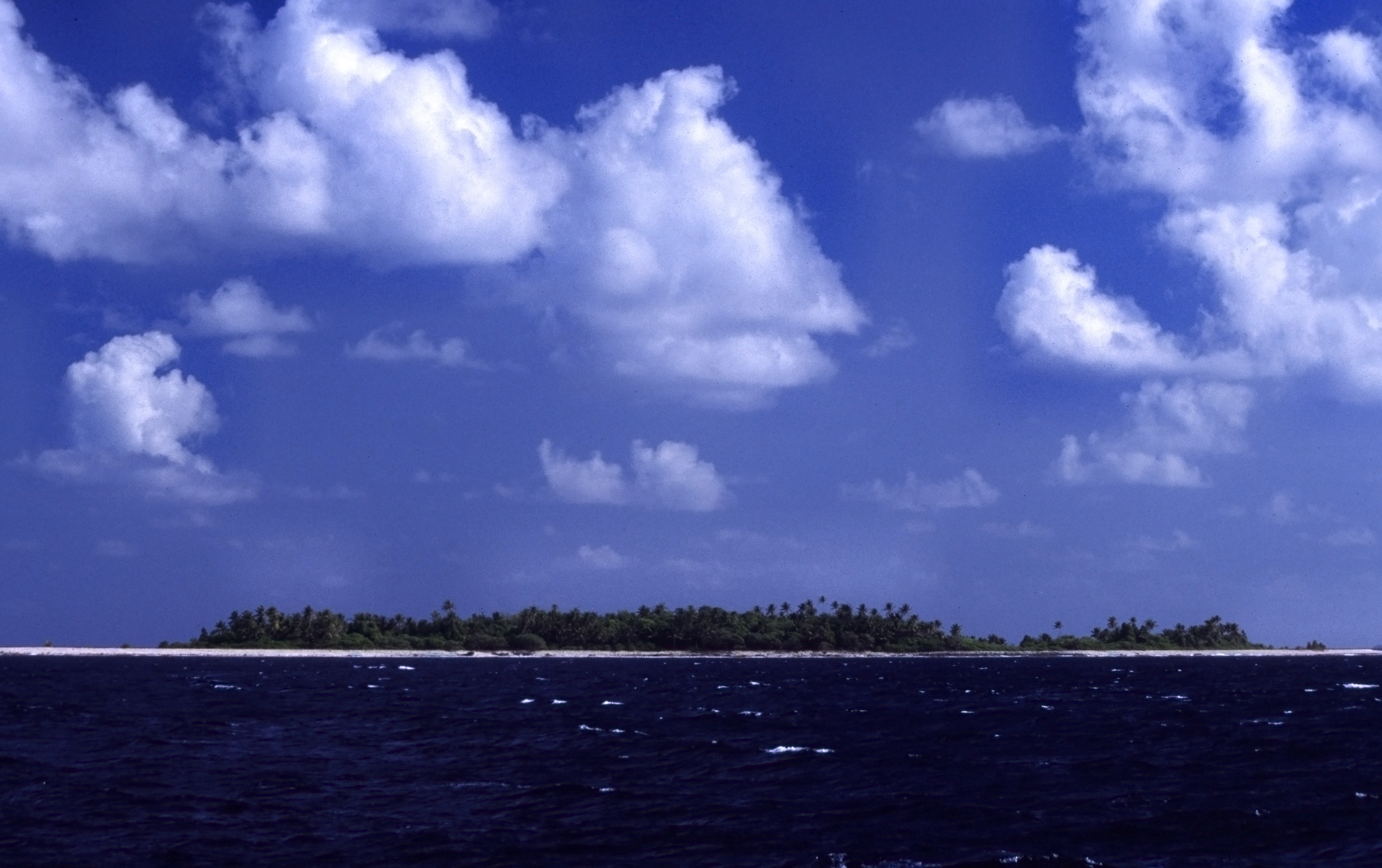
Funafuti

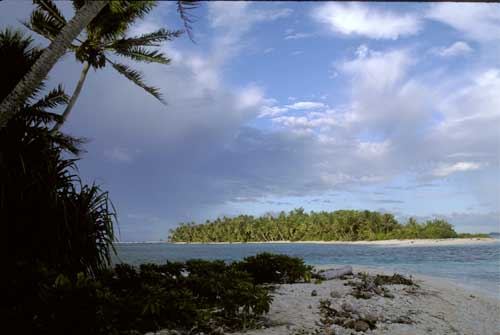
Fualifeke Islet

Locally Managed Marine Areas (LMMA) have been established on some of the islands by the community council, known as the Falekaupule (the traditional assembly of elders). Tuvalu has established ten LMMAs on eight of its nine islands.

The rising population on Funafuti has resulted in an increased demand on fish stocks in Funafuti lagoon (Te Namo), although the creation of the Funafuti Conservation Area (FCA) has provided a fishing exclusion area to help sustain the fish population across the Funafuti lagoon. The FCA includes 20% of the reef area of Funafuti atoll. The FCA is located 15 kilometres (9.3 mi) across the lagoon from the main island of Fongafale. The marine environment of the FCA includes reef, lagoon, channel and ocean; and are home to many species of fish, corals, algae and invertebrates. The results of the surveys by Job and Ceccarelli in 2010 found that coral cover was not significantly different inside and outside the FCA, however the LCC levels tended to be slightly higher outside the FCA, with mean values of 11% inside the FCA and 19% outside. Three species of giant clams (Tridacnidae) have been identified in the Funafuti lagoon, mainly within the FCA: Tridacna maxima (the most abundant), Tridacna squamosa and Tridacna derasa.

Nanumaga has a LMMA, which encompasses the entire island. Spear fishing is also totally banned on the reef and, no fishing is allowed on the reef on the western side of the island, except handlining.

The Nanumea conservation area was established in 2006 as a no-fishing zone covering about 20% of the total reef area of Nanumea.

The Nui conservation area covers the northern half of the lagoon; with a LMMA established over the remainder of the lagoon and reef.

Niutao has a LMMA encompassing all of the reef; with small conservation areas established over specific places on the reef.

Nukufetau has a LMMA encompassing most of the lagoon; with a conservation area established over the remainder of the lagoon.

The Nukulaelae conservation area covers the eastern end of the lagoon; with a LMMA covering the rest of the lagoon. A baseline survey of marine life in the conservation zone was conducted by Job and Ceccarelli in 2010.

Vaitupu has a LMMA encompassing most of the larger lagoon; with conservation areas established over the remainder of the larger lagoon and the smaller lagoon at the north end of the island.

== See also ==
- Ocean acidification
