= Tepuka =

Island in Funafuti atoll, Tuvalu

Geography
- Location: Pacific Ocean
- Coordinates: 8°27′46″S 179°04′49″E
- Archipelago: Funafuti

Administration
- Tuvalu

Demographics
- Languages: Tuvaluan, English

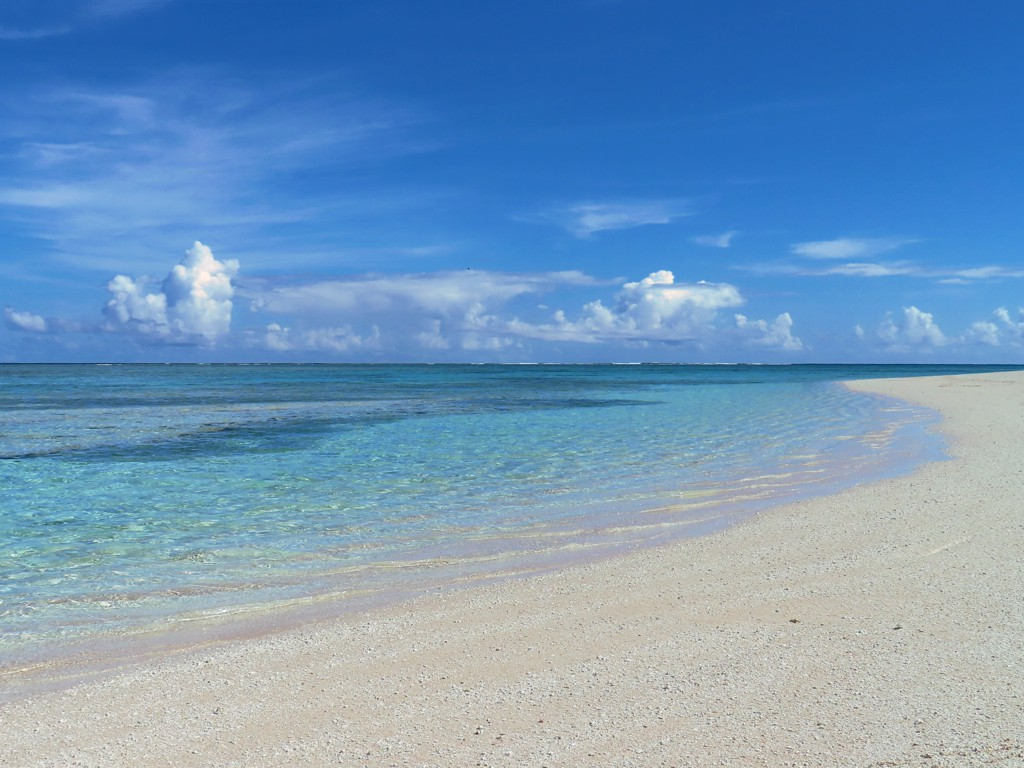
Coast of Tepuka, 2025

Tepuka is an island eighteen kilometers west of Fongafale, in the northwest of Funafuti, the main atoll of the Oceanian nation of Tuvalu. Te puka, or Pouka, is the name of a tree - Hernandia peltata.

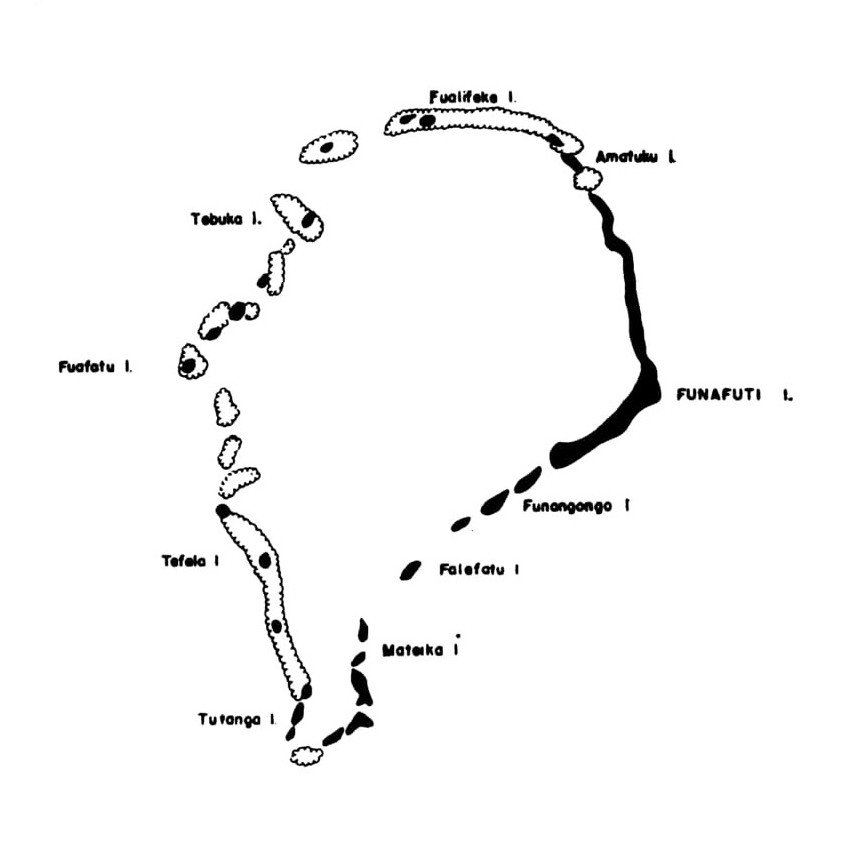
Map of Funafuti with Tepuka on the top left

There is a well-preserved underground bunker on the island, which was an American communications outpost built during the Pacific War, which was connected to the military airfield on Fongafale.

The island lies between the smaller islet of Tepuka Vili Vili in the southwest, the smaller islet of Te Afualiku in the northeast, the Pacific Ocean on the west and the Funafuti lagoon called Te Namo on the east. In recent years the island has been majorly eroded. Te Ava Tepuka and Te Avua Sari are two neighbouring passages through Funafuti atoll in the northeast, between the islets of Te Afualiku to the northeast and Tepuka to the southwest.

Tepuka is to the north of the Funafuti Conservation Area, which encompasses 33 square kilometers (12.74 square miles) of reef, lagoon and six motu (islets) to the south of Tepuku: Tepuka Vili Vili, (also called Tepuka Savilivili); Fualopa; Fuafatu; Vasafua; Fuagea (also called Fuakea) and Tefala.

Lepidodactylus tepukapili is a species of gecko, which has been located on Tepuka and on Fuagea (also called Fuakea).
