= Acropora papillare =

Conservation status
- Endangered (IUCN 3.1)

Scientific classification
- Kingdom: Animalia
- Phylum: Cnidaria
- Subphylum: Anthozoa
- Class: Hexacorallia
- Order: Scleractinia
- Family: Acroporidae
- Genus: Acropora
- Species: A. papillare

Binomial name
- Acropora papillare Latypov, 1992

Synonyms
- Acropora indiana Wallace, 1994

Species of coral

Acropora papillare is a species of acroporid coral that was first described by Latypov in 1992. Found in marine, tropical, shallow reefs in areas exposed to waves, it occurs at depths of between 1 and 5 m (3.3 and 16.4 ft). It is classed as a vulnerable species on the IUCN Red List, and it has a decreasing population. It is uncommon but found over a large area, including in three regions of Indonesia, and is classified under CITES Appendix II.

== Description ==
Acropora papillare is found in colonies composed of clump-like structures, and curved branches. Branches grow up to 80 millimetres (3.1 in) long and are between 15 and 30 millimetres (0.59 and 1.18 in) in diameter. The species is blue or brown in colour, and the branches contain axial corallites and radial corallites. The axial corallites, located at the end of the branches, are small (outer diameters of up to 3.4 mm) and the polyp-covering cup is thick. Radial corallites are uniform in size and have conspicuous lips. Its features make it look similar to three other Acropora species, A. abrotanoides, A. aspera, and A. robusta. Found in regions prone to strong waves, this species occurs in a marine environment in tropical, shallow reefs. It occurs on the flats of reefs and also in very shallow reefs, and is found at depths between 1 and 5 m (3.3 and 16.4 ft).

== Distribution ==
Acropora papillare is uncommon and found over a large area; Australia, Japan, three regions of Indonesia, the Indo-Pacific, the East China Sea, and Southeast Asia. Native to Australia, Vietnam, Cambodia, Thailand, Taiwan, Singapore, Malaysia, Indonesia, Japan, the Cocos Islands, and the Philippines. he population of the species is known to be decreasing. It is threatened by climate change, coral disease, rising sea temperatures leading to bleaching, reef destruction, being prey to Acanthaster planci, and human activity. It is rated as a vulnerable species on the IUCN Red List, is listed CITES Appendix II, and could occur within Marine Protected Areas.

== Taxonomy ==
It was first described by Y. Y. Latypov in 1992 as Acropora papillare in Vietnam.
