= Funafuti Conservation Area =

Marine conservation area in Tuvalu

Coordinates: 8°31′S 179°03′E

Kogatapu (protected area)
- Interactive map of Funafuti Conservation Area

Geography
- Location: Western side Funafuti atoll, south of Tepuka islet (highlighted above)
- Archipelago: Funafuti
- Total islands: 6
- Major islands: Tepuka Vili Vili, (also called Tepuka Savilivili); Fualopa; Fuafatu; Vasafua; Fuagea (also called as Fuakea) and Tefala.
- Area: 33 km^{2} (13 sq mi)
- Highest elevation: 3 m (10 ft)

Administration
- Tuvalu

The Funafuti Conservation Area is a marine conservation area covering 33 square kilometers (12.74 square miles) of reef, lagoon and motu (islets) on the western side of Funafuti atoll in Tuvalu. The marine environment of the conservation area includes reef, lagoon, channel and ocean; and are home to many species of fish, corals, algae and invertebrates. The islets are nesting sites for the green sea turtle (Chelonia mydas) and Fualopa hosts a breeding colony of black noddy (Anous minutes).

The decision to create a protected area (Kogatapu) was made in 1999; the purpose of the Funafuti Conservation Area is the conservation of the marine and land based biodiversity (plants, animals and ecosystems) within the protected area. The boundaries of the Funafuti Conservation Area encompass about 20 percent of the total coral reef area of Funafuti lagoon (Te Namo), and is an important part of the protection of the coral reefs of Tuvalu.

== History ==
The project to create the Kogatapu began under the administration of the Funafuti Falekaupule (the Funafuti local council) and with the support of the Secretariat of the Pacific Regional Environment Programme (SPREP), the conservation area was funded under SPREP's South Pacific Biodiversity Conservation Programme (SPBCP). After surveys of the marine environment, and consultation with the land owners and the Kaupule o Funafuti, (the elders and decision makers of Funafuti), the Government of Tuvalu created the Kogatapu in the Kaupule o Funafuti Conservation Area Order made under Section 3 of the Conservation Area Act, which order took effect on 1 December 1999.

== Land and marine environment ==
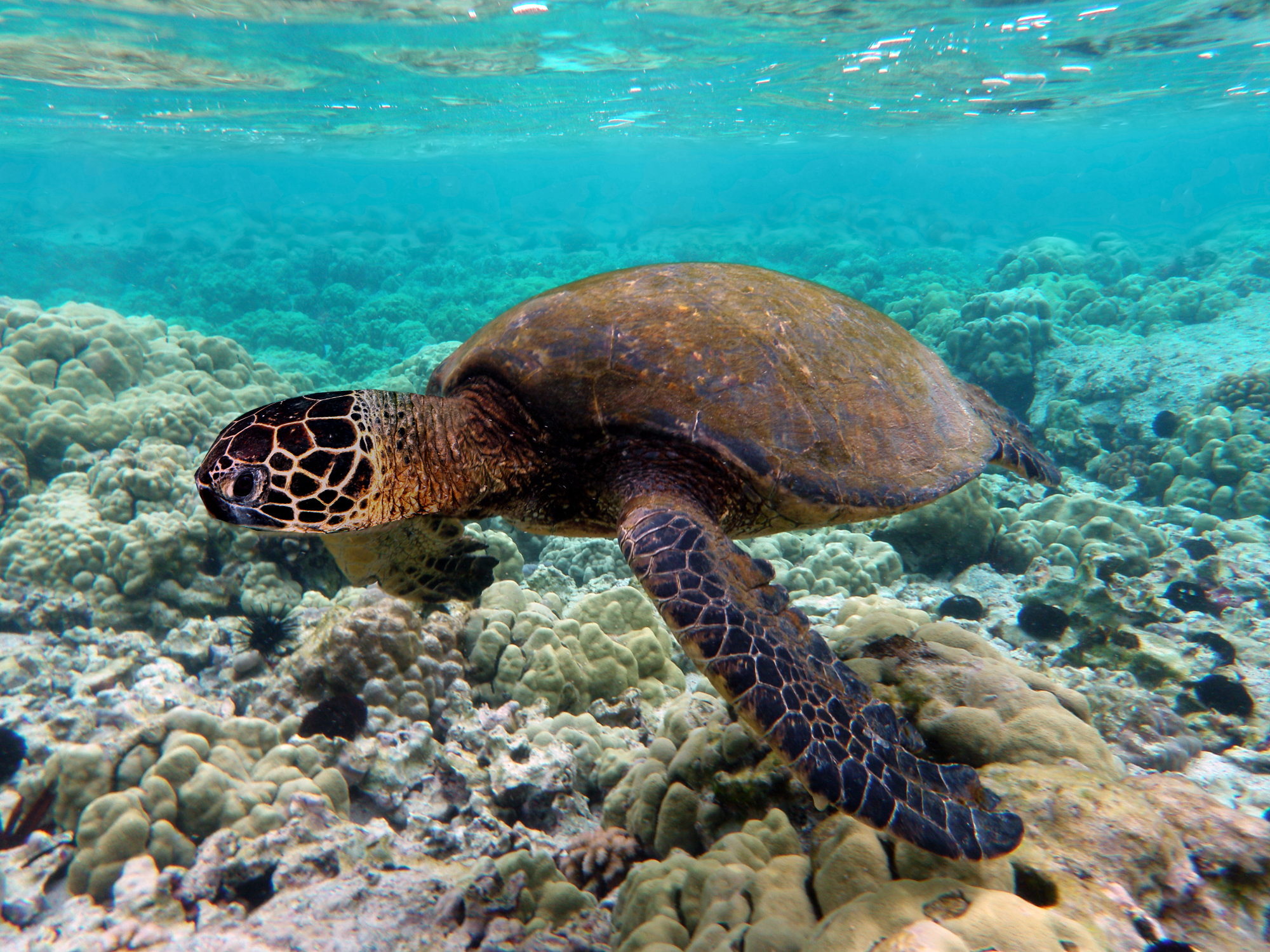
Green sea turtle

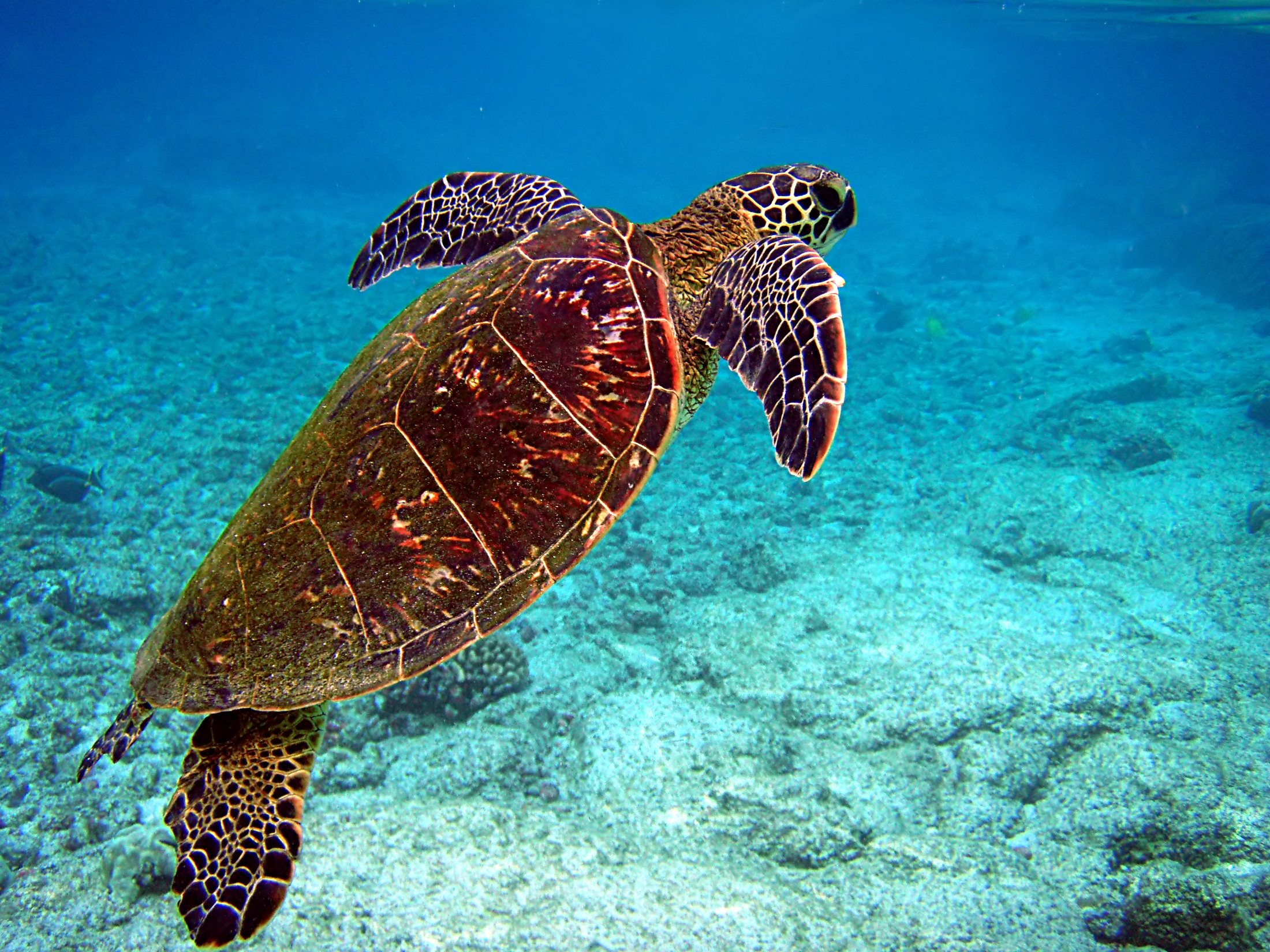
Green sea turtle swimming towards surface

The Funafuti Conservation Area is sometimes called the 'Kogatapu Conservation Area' or 'Funafuti Marine Conservation Area'. Six islets (motu, in the Tuvaluan language) are included in the Funafuti Conservation Area: Tepuka Vili Vili, (also called Tepuka Savilivili); Fualopa; Fuafatu; Vasafua; Fuagea (also called Fuakea) and Tefala. Vasafua was severely damaged by Cyclone Pam. The coconut palms were washed away, leaving the islet as a sand bar.

The Tuvalu National Biodiversity Strategy and Action Plan of 2009 describes the marine environment as comprising six major ecosystem types: oceanic, outer reef, lagoonal, back reef, lagoon floor, and patch reefs, plus natural channels between the ocean and lagoon. It says these ecosystems produce sediment that is required for island building and maintenance and support communities of corals, other invertebrates, algae, plankton, fish and marine mammals and reptiles.

The terrestrial invertebrates that are found in Tuvalu are land and shore crabs, including paikea (Discoplax rotunda), tupa (Cardisoma carnifex), kamakama (Grapsus albolineatus), a range of hermit crabs, uga (Coenobita spp) and the coconut crab, ū or uu (Birgus latro).

The islets are also nesting sites for the green sea turtle (Chelonia mydas)(fonu in tuvaluan). The IUCN Red List identifies only the green turtle as being found in Tuvalu. The green turtle is recognised as critically endangered. The Secretariat of the Pacific Regional Environment Programme (SPREP) lists two additional turtle species as being found in Tuvalu: hawksbill sea turtle (Eretmochelys Imbricate) and leatherback sea turtle (Dermochelys coriacea), with both species being recognised as critically endangered.

The marine environment of the Kogatapu includes reef, lagoon, channel and ocean; and are home to many species of fish, corals, algae and invertebrates. Surveys prior to 1999 identified 76 species of indicator fish, 141 species of food fish and 149 mobile invertebrates such as crabs and sea cucumbers. A 2007 survey established that fish populations had increased as a result of the Funafuti Conservation Area. Large-sized individual fishes of the highly prized target food species, such as grouper and snapper were observed; the presence of so many large fish of desirable target food species indicates that there is very low fishing pressure in the Funafuti Conservation Area, although enforcement by conservation rangers of the no-fishing rules is necessary to preserve the fish stock.

Surveys were carried out in May 2010 of the reef habitats of Nanumea, Nukulaelae and Funafuti (including the Funafuti Conservation Area) and a total of 317 fish species were recorded during this Tuvalu Marine Life study. The surveys identified 66 species that had not previously been recorded in Tuvalu, which brings the total number of identified species to 607.

The general Tuvaluan name for an eel is pusi or puhi, or in relation to eared eels, tuna, such as the black-edged conger eel, (Conger cinereus). The most common species are: (pusi kena or puhi tea) peppered moray (Gymnothorax pictus); (pusi uli) whitemouth moray (Gymnothorax meleagris); (pusi ulaula or puhi gatala) giant moray (Gymnothorax javanicus); (puleva), starry or snowflake moray (Echidna nebulosa). (Pusi uli or puhi), fimbriated moray (Gymnothorax fimbriatus), also known as dark-spotted moray or spot-face moray, is a moray eel that is also found on the reefs.

Low densities of reef sharks (magō) were recorded in the Tuvalu Marine Life study. Four species of reef shark have been identified: (magō or lālāila) grey reef shark (Carcharhinus amblyrhynchos); (kili) blacktip reef shark (Carcharhinus melanopterus); (malu) whitetip reef shark (Triaenodon obesus); and (alava) lemon shark (Negaprion brevirostris), which are all listed on the IUCN Red List of threatened species, as 'near threatened' species. (magō samala) Scalloped hammerhead sharks (Sphyrna lewini) are also seen off the reefs.

The Tuvalu Marine Life study also recorded low densities of two species of rays (fai): (fai fālua or fai pulou) manta ray (Manta birostris); and (fai manu) spotted eagle ray (Aetobatus narinari), which are both listed on the IUCN Red List of threatened species, as 'near threatened' species.

== Oceanic species ==
The range of (uninuni) tiger shark (Galeocerdo cuvier), oceanic whitetip shark (Carcharhinus longimanus) and mako shark (Isurus) includes the ocean around Tuvalu. The mako is known as rokea in the Tuvaluan language.

Skipjack tuna, yellowfin tuna, bigeye tuna and giant trevally are the larger pelagic fish that are found in the ocean around Tuvalu.

The pantropical spotted dolphin (Stenella attenuata) and other cetacea, including sperm whale (Physeter macrocephalus ) and orca or killer whale (Orcinus orca), are also found in the ocean around Tuvalu.

== Bird life of Tuvalu ==
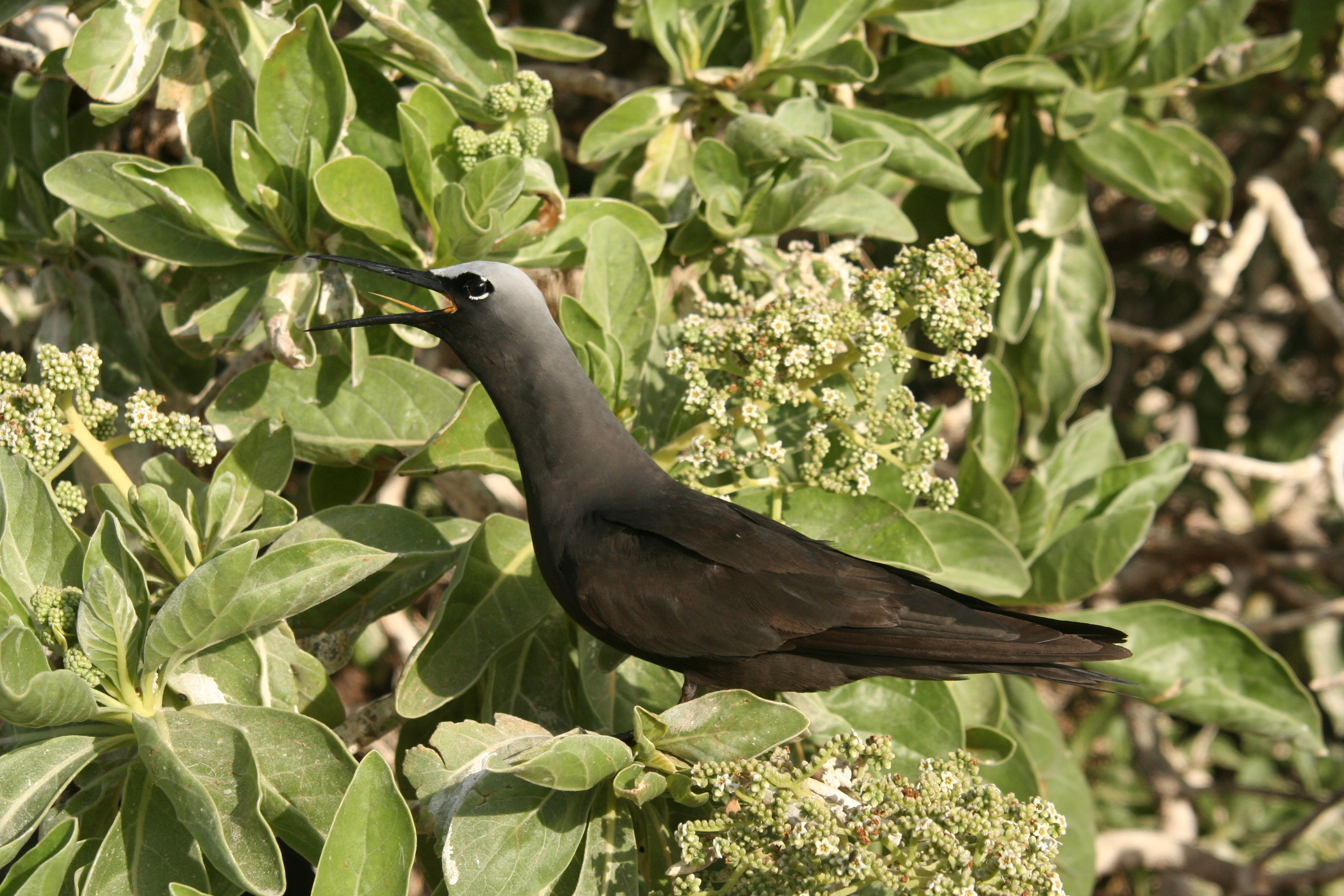
Black noddy calling at colony

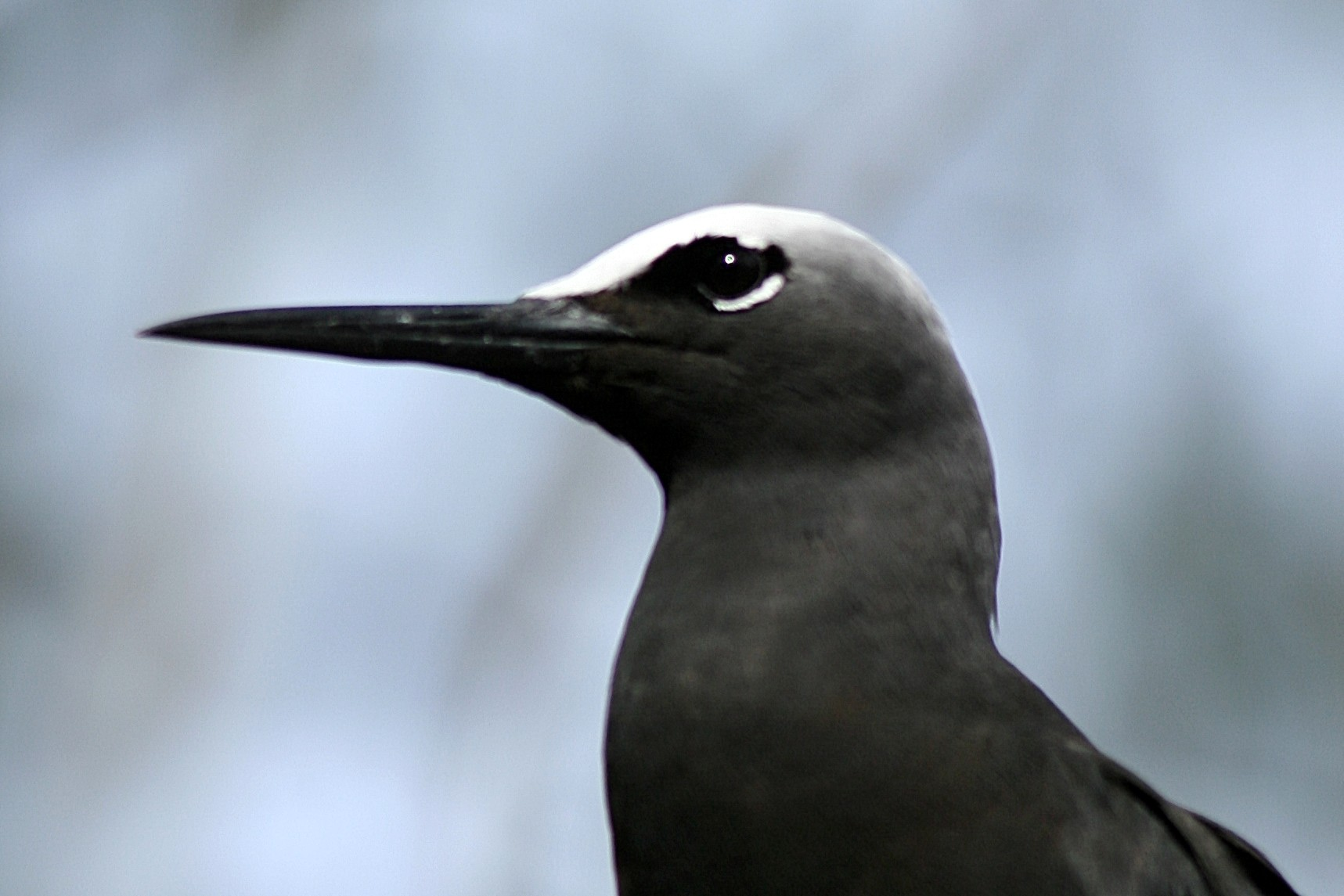
Black noddy

Surveys have established a total of 35 bird species as confirmed in Tuvalu, including:

- 9 species of terns (Sternidae)
- 7 species of sandpipers (Scolopacidae)
- 4 species of shearwaters and petrels (Procellariidae)
- 3 species of boobies (Sulidae)
- 2 species of tropicbirds (Phaethontidae)
  - Great frigatebird (Fregata minor)
  - Lesser frigatebird (Fregata ariel)

Pacific imperial pigeon (Ducula pacifica) live in the broadleaf forest. Migratory birds are found in Tuvalu, such as long-tailed cuckoo (Eudynamys taitensis) or areva (Tuvaluan). The birds found in Tuvalu include 17 breeding species, such as:

- eight species of migratory shorebirds, including the globally threatened species, bristle-thighed curlew (Numenius tahitiensis); and
- nine species of seabirds, including black noddy (Anous minutes) or taketake (Tuvaluan).

Fualopa hosts a breeding colony of black noddy.

== Native broadleaf forest ==
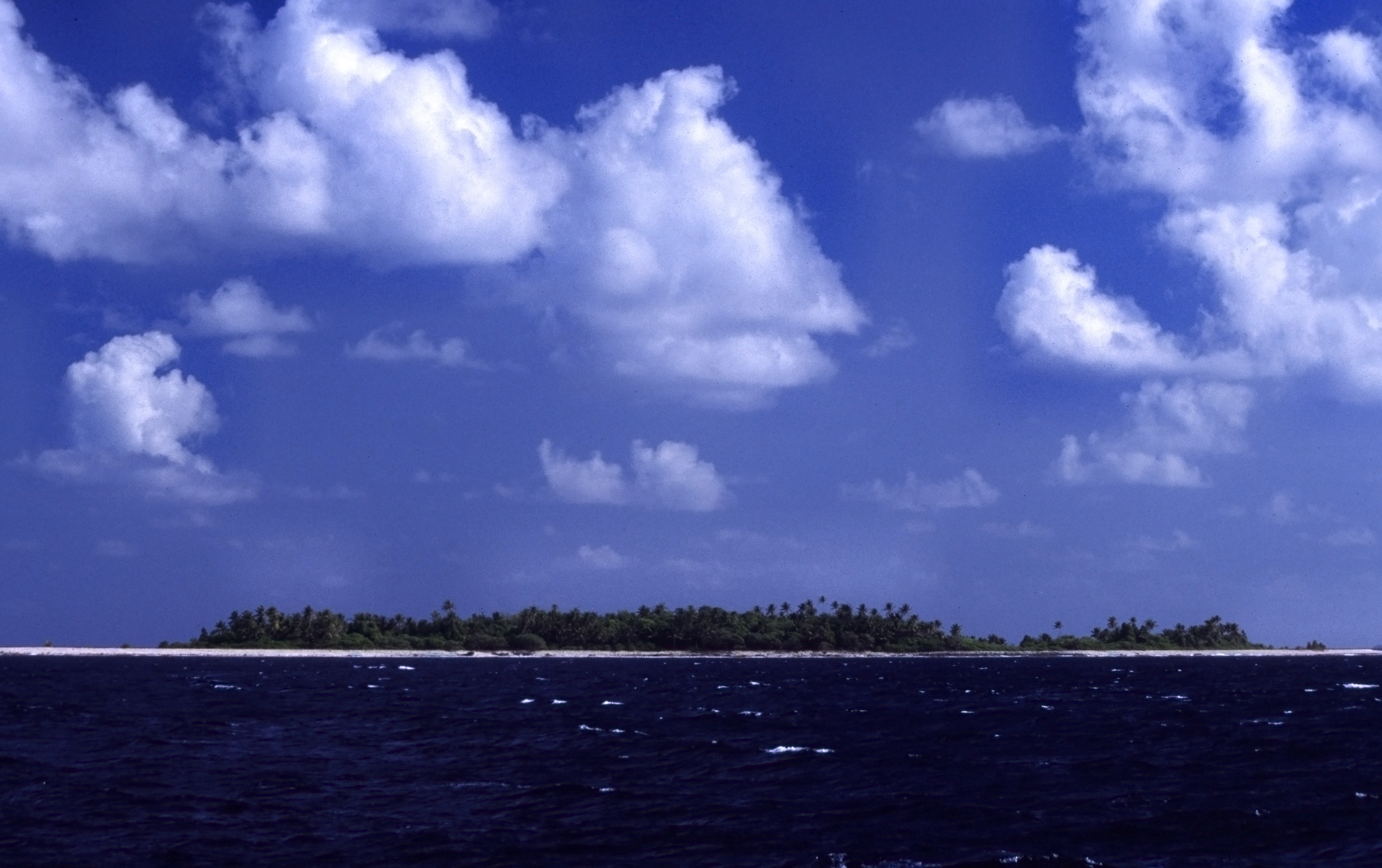
Funafuti

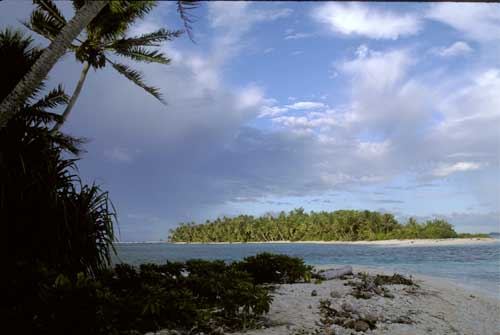
Fualifeke Islet

The native broadleaf forest is limited to 4.1% of the vegetation types on the islands of Tuvalu. The islets of the Kogatapu have 40% of the remaining native broadleaf forest on Funafuti atoll. The other land cover types found on Funafuti include coastal littoral forest and scrub, mangroves and wetlands.

The Tuvalu forest gecko (Lepidodactylus tepukapili) is endemic to Tuvalu, and has been located in the Kogatapu on Fuagea (also called Fuakea) and on Tepuka.

While coconut palms are common in Tuvalu, they are usually cultivated rather than naturally seeding and growing. Tuvaluan traditional histories are that the first settlers of the islands planted coconut palms as they were not found on the islands. The native broadleaf forest of Funafuti includes the following species, that were described by Charles Hedley in 1896, which includes the Tuvaluan name (some of which may follow Samoan plant names):

- Fala or screw pine, (Pandanus)
- Puka or pouka, (Hernandia peltata)
- Futu, (Barringtonia asiatica)
- Fetau, (Calophyllum inophyllum)
- Ferra, (Ficus aspem), native fig
- Fau or fo fafini, or woman's fibre tree (Hibiscus tiliaceus)
- Lakoumonong, (Wedelia strigulosa)
- Lou, (Cardamine sarmentosa)
- Meili, (Polypodium), fern
- Laukatafa, Asplenium nidus, bird's-nest fern
- Milo or miro, (Thespesia populnea)
- Ngashu or naupaka, (Scaevola taccada)
- Ngia or ingia, (Pemphis acidula), bush
- Nonou or nonu, (Morinda citrifolia)
- Sageta, (Dioclea violacea), vine
- Pukavai, (Pisonia grandis)
- Talla talla gemoa, (Psilotum triquetrum), fern
- Tausunu or tausoun, (Heliotropium foertherianum)
- Tonga or tongo, (Rhizophora mucronata), found around swamps
- Tulla tulla, (Triumfetta procumbens), whose prostrate stems trailed for several feet over the ground
- Valla valla, (Premna tahitensis)

Donald Gilbert Kennedy, the resident district officer in the administration of the Gilbert and Ellice Islands Colony from 1932 to 1938, identified other trees found in the broadleaf forest:

- Pua, (Guettarda speciosa)
- Kanava, (Cordia subcordata)

== Access to the Kogatapu ==
The protected lagoon, coral reefs and bommies of the Kogatapu provide for snorkeling and scuba diving. Access to the Funafuti Conservation Area is by boat; the Conservation Area is 15 kilometres (9.3 mi) across the lagoon (called Te Namo) from the main island of Fongafale.

== See also ==
- Coral reefs of Tuvalu
