= Te Afualiku =

Island in Funafuti atoll, Tuvalu

Coordinates: 8°26′07.4″S 179°05′40.5″E

Te Afualiku is an islet of Funafuti, Tuvalu. It is the smallest island of Tuvalu.

Te Ava Tepuka and Te Avua Sari are two neighbouring passages through Funafuti atoll in the northeast, between the islets of Te Afualiku to the northeast and Tepuka to the southwest.

Te Ava i te Lape is the favoured entrance into the lagoon, although it has a depth of only 5.8 metres (19 ft), and a width of barely 500 metres (1,600 ft). It is in the north, between the islets of Pava to the east and Te Afualiku to the west.

At COP27, Simon Kofe announced that Te Afualiku was being digitized to the metaverse to protect the nation from sea level rise. The action went viral online.
