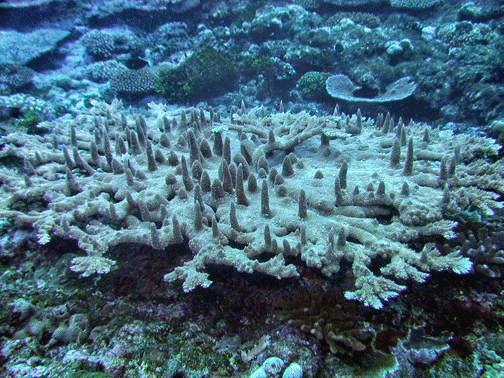

Conservation status
- Least Concern (IUCN 3.1)

Scientific classification
- Kingdom: Animalia
- Phylum: Cnidaria
- Subphylum: Anthozoa
- Class: Hexacorallia
- Order: Scleractinia
- Family: Acroporidae
- Genus: Acropora
- Species: A. abrotanoides

Binomial name
- Acropora abrotanoides (Lamarck, 1816)

Synonyms
- List: Acropora danai (Edwards & Haime, 1860); Acropora erythraea (Klunzinger, 1879); Acropora irregularis (Brook, 1892); Acropora mangarevensis Vaughan, 1906; Acropora rotumana (Gardiner, 1898); Acropora tutuilensis Hoffmeister, 1925; Heteropora abrotanoides (Lamarck, 1816); Madrepora abrotanoides Lamarck, 1816; Madrepora crassa Edwards & Haime, 1860; Madrepora danai Milne Edwards & Haime, 1860; Madrepora deformis Dana, 1846; Madrepora erythraea Klunzinger, 1879; Madrepora irregularis Brook, 1892; Madrepora rotumana Gardiner, 1898

= Acropora abrotanoides =

Species of coral

Acropora abrotanoides is a species of acroporid coral found in Indo-Pacific waters from the Red Sea and the Gulf of Aden east to the East China Sea, Japan, the central Pacific Ocean and Australia. It is found in shallow coral reefs that are exposed to the action of strong waves, at depths up to 15 m. It is vulnerable to coral bleaching, disease and crown-of-thorns starfish. It is resistant to predation as it has well-developed radial corallite lips.

== Taxonomy and systematics ==
Acropora abrotanoides was first described by Lamarck in 1816 as Madrepora abrotanoides. Acropora irregularis was formerly considered as a separate species, but is now considered as synonymous with Acropora abrotanoides.

== Description ==
It occurs in colonies of fused branches growing across the seabed (prostrate) with vertical outer branches with diameters of up to 3 metres (9.8 ft); these can be table-shaped. In the centre of a colony, the branches are fused together—these can be either elongated or conical, sometimes with ends tapering to a point. Its branches contain both axial and radial corallites; radial corallites have been observed as elongated and axial corallites occur in varying numbers and are rasp-like or tubular in shape. Radial corallites have evolved to have well-developed tips preventing predation. It is green-grey or pink-brown in colour and is similar to Acropora pinguis, and Acropora robusta.

== Distribution ==
Acropora abrotanoides is found from the Gulf of Aden and the Red Sea, through the Indian Ocean to the Pacific Ocean and the East China Sea, Australia, and Japan. It also occurs in the south-eastern Atlantic Ocean.

== Threats ==
It is classed as a least concern species on the IUCN Red List, but it is believed that its population is decreasing, and it is listed under Appendix II of CITES. Figures of its population are unknown, but is likely to be threatened by the global reduction of coral reefs, the increase of temperature causing coral bleaching, climate change, human activity, the crown-of-thorns starfish (Acanthaster planci) and disease.
