= Fuagea =

Island in Funafuti atoll, Tuvalu

Coordinates: 8°34′31″S 179°03′58″E

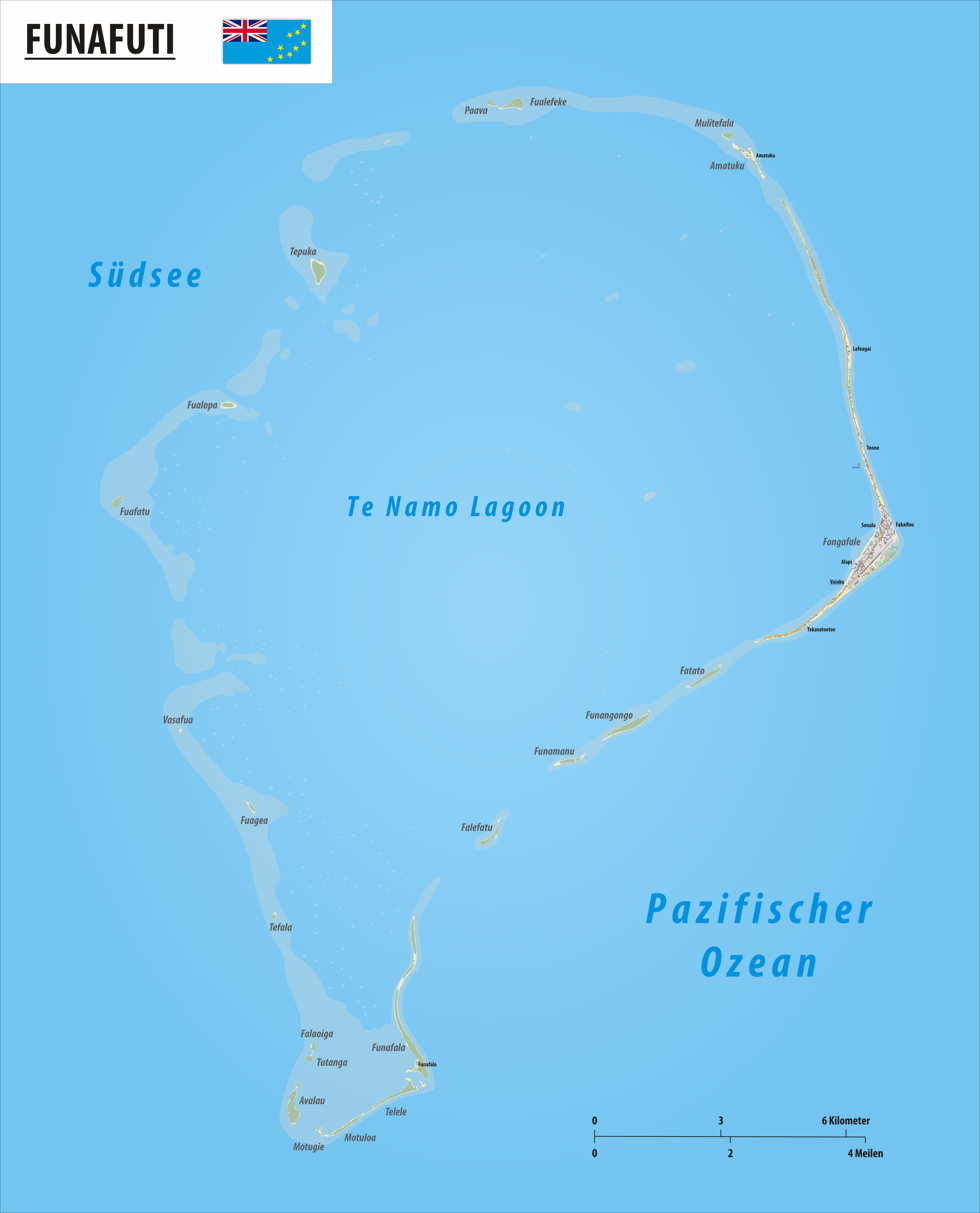
Map of Funafuti

Fuagea is an islet located in the archipelago of Tuvalu in the south-western part of the atoll of Funafuti.

Fuagea (also known as Fuakea), is part of the Funafuti Conservation Area, established in 1996 with the aim of preserving the natural fauna and flora of the area.

Lepidodactylus tepukapili is a species of gecko, which has been located on Fuagea and on Tepuka.
