= Fualopa =

Island in Funafuti atoll, Tuvalu

Coordinates: 8°29′26″S 179°03′39″E

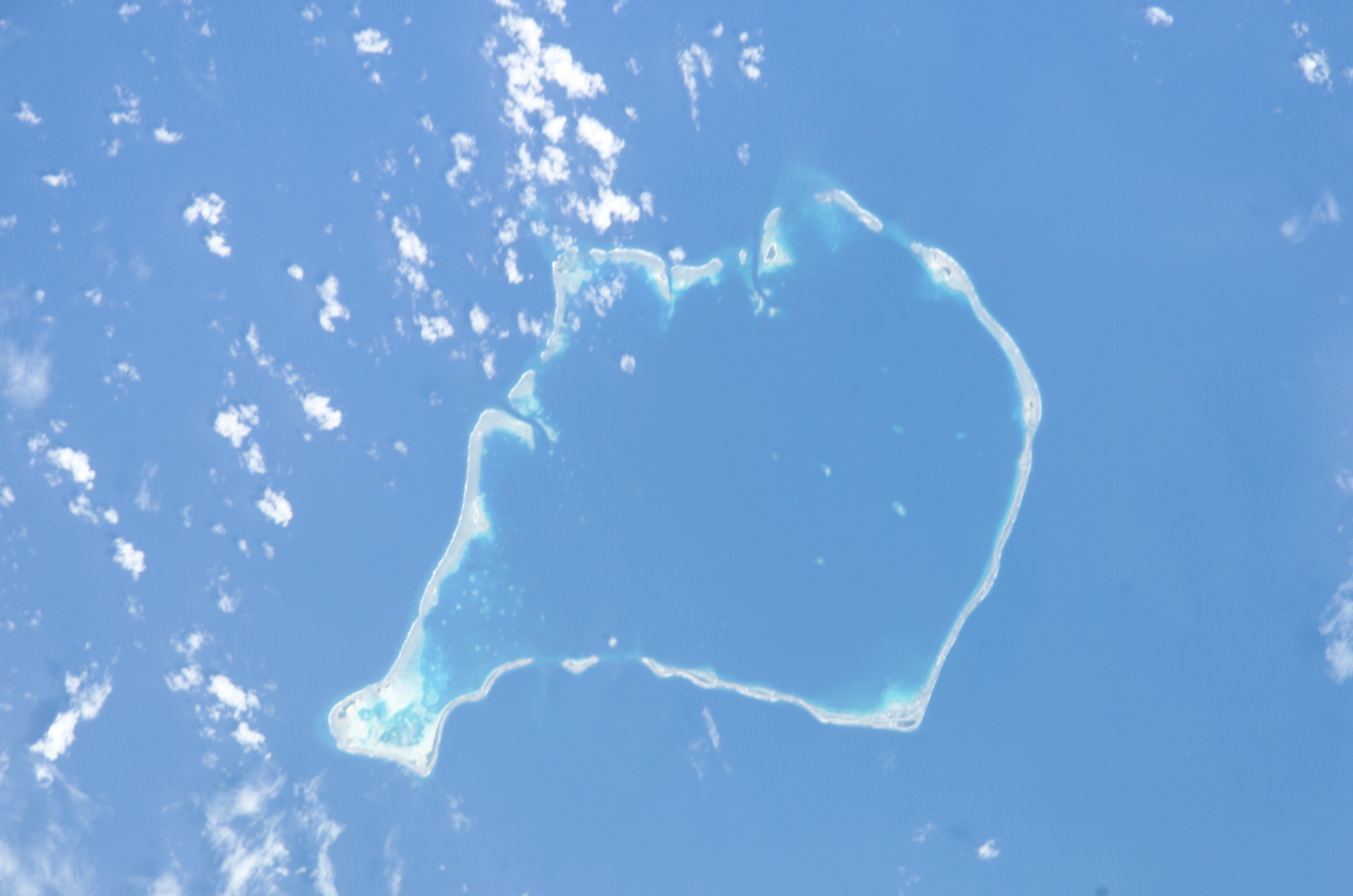
Funafuti islands

Fualopa is an islet of Funafuti, Tuvalu. It is part of the Funafuti Conservation Area, established in 1996 with the aim of preserving the natural fauna and flora of the area. Fualopa hosts a breeding colony of black noddy (Anous minutus or white-capped noddy).

Te Ava Kum Kum is the passage through the Funafuti atoll of the western rim, south of Te Ava Tepuka Vili, between the islets of Tepuka Vili Vili to the north and Fualopa immediately south.
