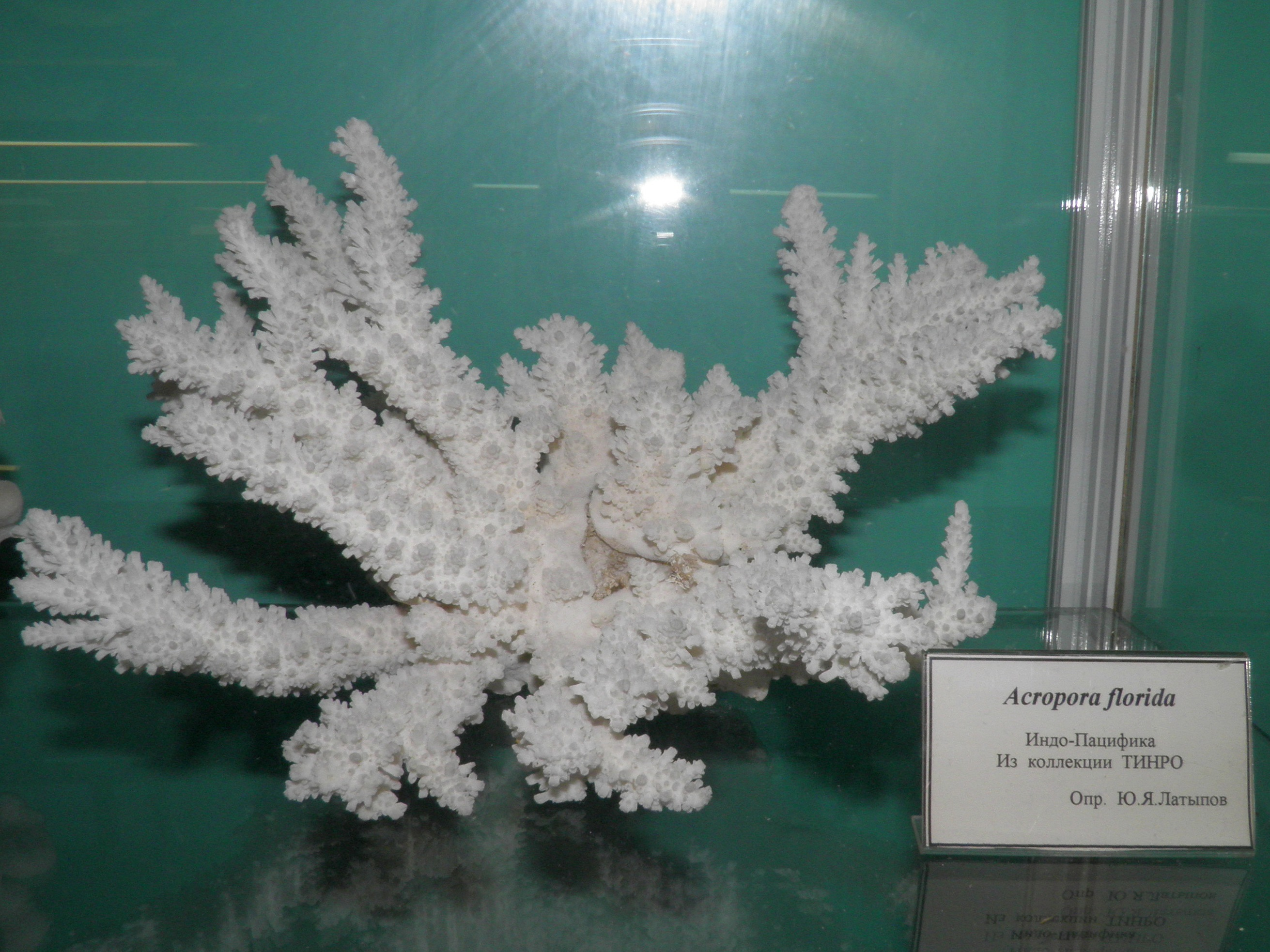

Conservation status
- Endangered (IUCN 3.1)

Scientific classification
- Kingdom: Animalia
- Phylum: Cnidaria
- Subphylum: Anthozoa
- Class: Hexacorallia
- Order: Scleractinia
- Family: Acroporidae
- Genus: Acropora
- Species: A. florida

Binomial name
- Acropora florida (Dana, 1846)

Synonyms
- List: Acropora affinis (Brook, 1893); Acropora gravida (Dana, 1846); Acropora multiramosa Nemenzo, 1967; Acropora polymorpha (Brook, 1891); Madrepora affinis Brook, 1893; Madrepora brachyclades Ortmann, 1888; Madrepora compressa Bassett-Smith, 1890; Madrepora florida Dana, 1846; Madrepora gravida Dana, 1846; Madrepora ornata Brook, 1891; Madrepora polymorpha Brook, 1891

= Branch coral =

Species of coral

The branch coral (Acropora florida) is a species of acroporid coral found in the southwest and northern Indian Ocean, the central Indo-Pacific, Australia, Southeast Asia, Japan and the East China Sea, Cook Islands and the oceanic west Pacific Ocean. It can be found in shallow reefs on the reef tops, walls and slopes to depths of 30 m.

== Description ==
Colonies of Acropora florida consist of thick upright, and sometimes horizontal, branches growing from a sprawling or encrusting base. There are side branches and small branchlets which resemble knobs. The corallites are evenly spread. The colour of this coral varies, and may be pinkish-brown or some shade of green.

== Biology ==
Acropora florida is a zooxanthellate species of coral. It obtains most of its nutritional needs from the symbiotic dinoflagellates that live inside its soft tissues. These photosynthetic organisms provide the coral with organic carbon and nitrogen, sometimes providing up to 90% of their host's energy needs for metabolism and growth. Its remaining needs are met by the planktonic organisms caught by the tentacles of the polyps.

== Status ==
This coral is a common species and no species-specific threats have been identified. The main threats faced by corals in general are related to climate change and the mechanical destruction of their coral reef habitats; increasing damage from extreme weather events, rising sea water temperatures and ocean acidification. The International Union for Conservation of Nature has assessed the conservation status of this species as being an endangered species. All corals receive protection by being listed on CITES Appendix II.
