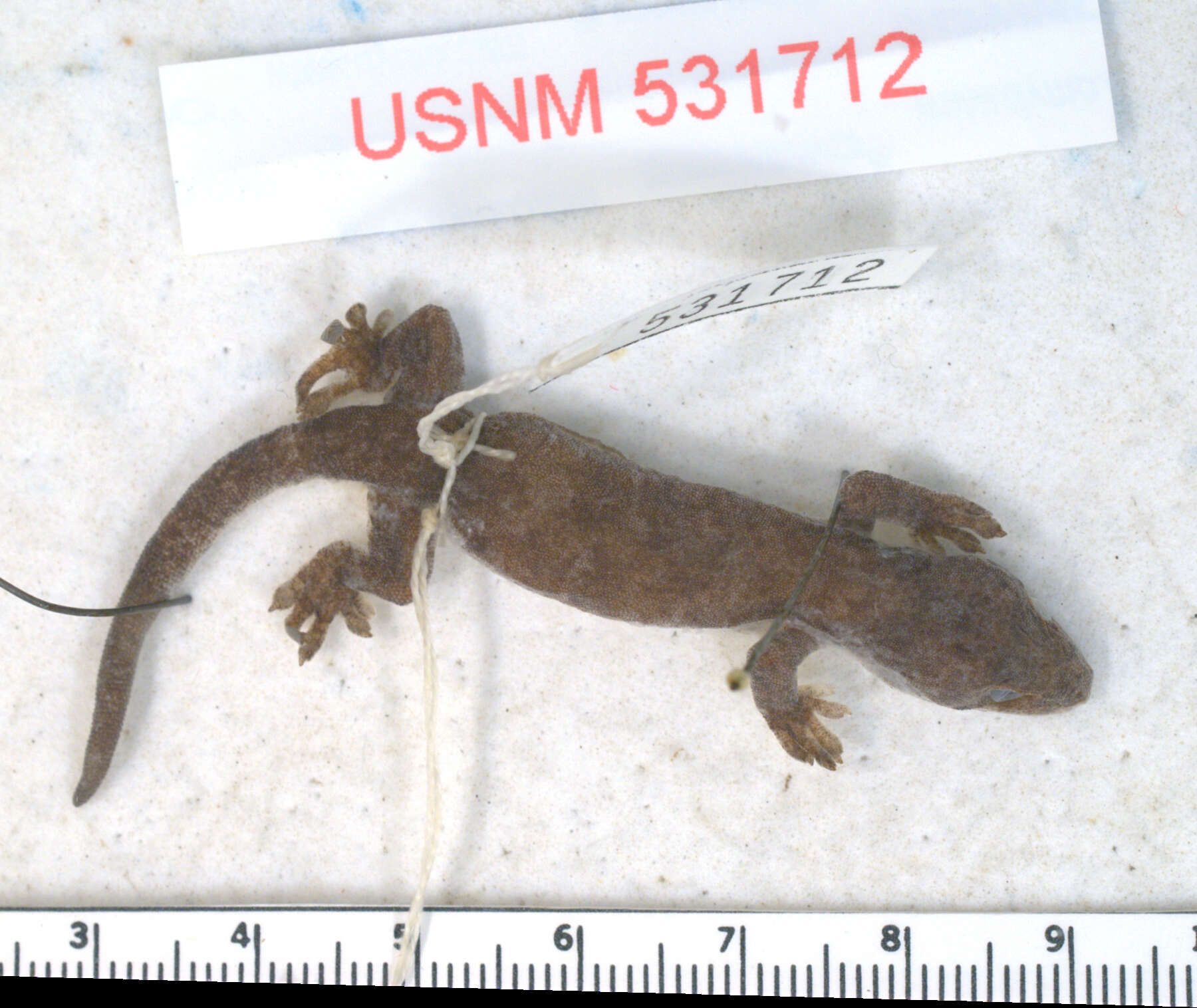
- Top view of Lepidodactylus tepukapili
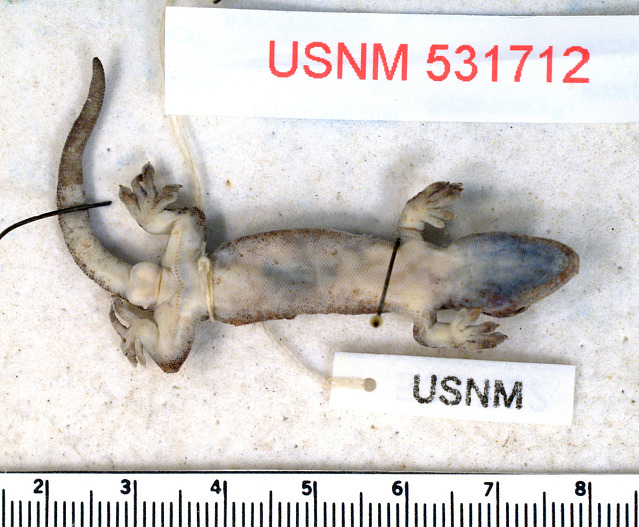
- Bottom view of Lepidodactylus tepukapili

Conservation status
- Critically Endangered (IUCN 3.1)

Scientific classification
- Kingdom: Animalia
- Phylum: Chordata
- Class: Reptilia
- Order: Squamata
- Suborder: Gekkota
- Family: Gekkonidae
- Genus: Lepidodactylus
- Species: L. tepukapili

Binomial name
- Lepidodactylus tepukapili Zug, Watling, Alefaio, Alefaio & Ludescher, 2003

= Lepidodactylus tepukapili =

Species of lizard

Lepidodactylus tepukapili, the Tuvalu forest gecko or the Funafuti scaly-toed gecko , is a species of lizard belonging to the family Gekkonidae, the common geckos. This gecko is endemic to Tuvalu.

== Taxonomy ==
Lepidodactylus tepukapili was first formally described in 2003 by George Robert Zug, Dick Watling, Tataua Alefaio, Semese Alefaio and Claudia Ludescher with its type locality given as Funafuti Atoll, Tuvalu Island, Polynesia at 8° 34’S, 179° 04’E. This species is a amember of This species belongs to the genus Lepidodactylus which is classified in the subfamily Gekkoninae in the family Gekkonidae.

== Etymology ==
Lepidodactylus tepukapili has a specific name which is based upon the Tuvaluan language words for "small lizard" and the island of Tepuka, where specimens were first discovered. In the Tuvaluan language this gecko is known as moko or pili.

== Description ==
Lepidodactylus tepukapili has a deep chocolate brown back broken up by paler patches or mottles on the sides, the underside is bright yellow. The scales around the eyes and lips are pale. The holotype had a snout–vent length of 50.3 mm (1.98 in).

== Distribution ==
Lepidodactylus tepukapili is the only recorded vertebrate that is endemic to Tuvalu. It has been located on Fuagea (also called Fuakea) and on Tepuka.

== Conservation status ==
Lepidodactylus tepukapili has been assessed by the International Union for Conservation of Nature as Critically Endangered due to the ongoing threat of sea-level rise, as related to anthropogenic climate change. The two small low-lying islands on which it occurs average just 2 metres above sea level. IUCN Red List.
