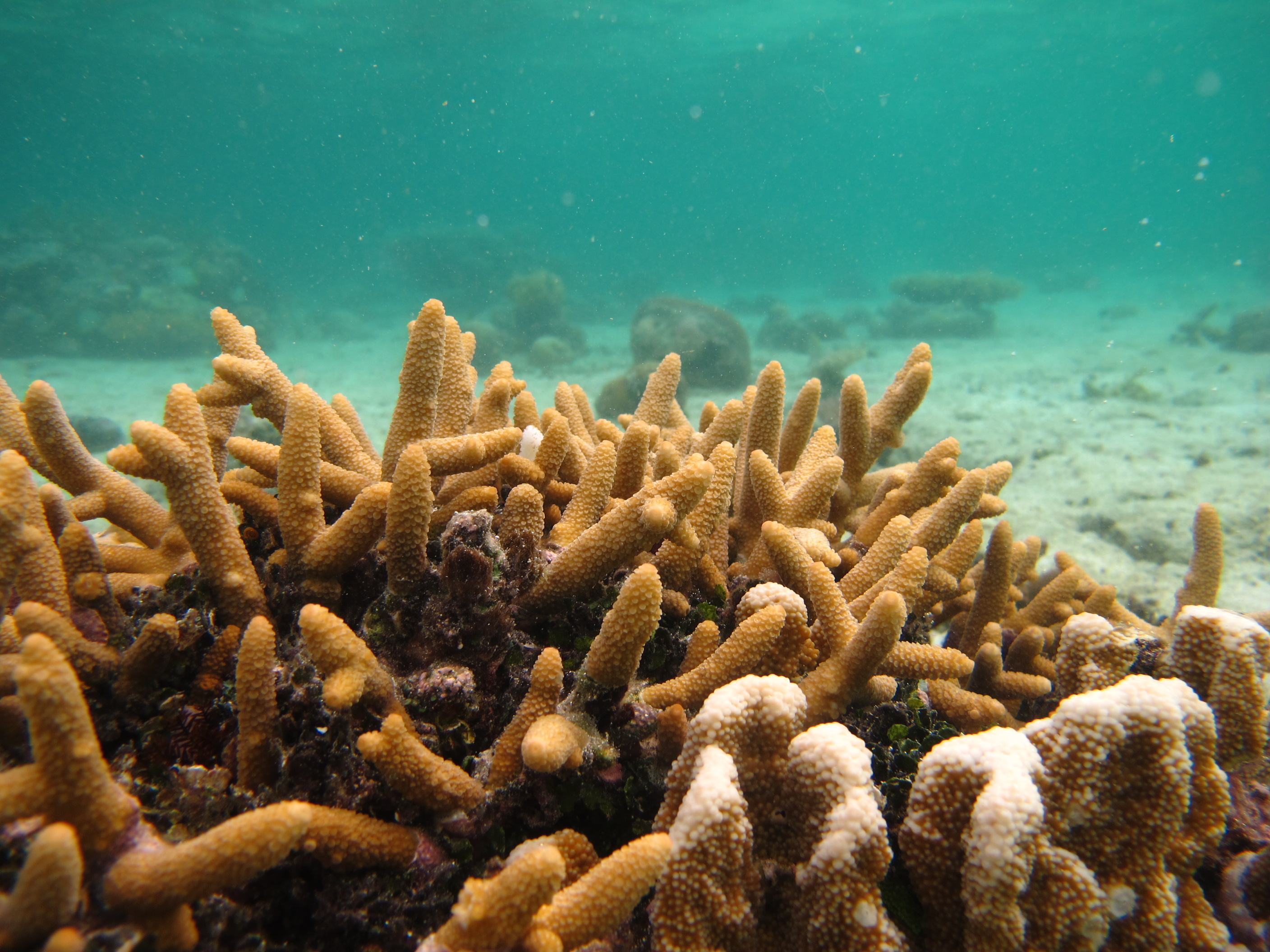

Conservation status
- Endangered (IUCN 3.1)

Scientific classification
- Kingdom: Animalia
- Phylum: Cnidaria
- Subphylum: Anthozoa
- Class: Hexacorallia
- Order: Scleractinia
- Family: Acroporidae
- Genus: Acropora
- Species: A. aspera

Binomial name
- Acropora aspera (Dana, 1845)

Synonyms
- List: Acropora hebes (Dana, 1846); Acropora yaeyamaensis Eguchi & Shirai, 1977; Madrepora aspera Dana, 1846; Madrepora cribripora Dana, 1846; Madrepora hebes Dana, 1846; Madrepora manni Quelch, 1886

= Acropora aspera =

Species of coral

Acropora aspera is a species of staghorn coral in the family Acroporidae. It is found on reef flats and in lagoons in very shallow water in the western Indo-Pacific Ocean.

== Description ==
Acropora aspera is a scantily branching, colonial coral forming low clumps. The individual branches are slender and only taper towards the tips. The corallites, the little stony cups from which the polyps grow, vary in size and are crowded closely together. The lower lip of each corallite protrudes slightly. Acropora aspera varies in colour, being pale green, grey or brown, or occasionally pale blue.

== Distribution and habitat ==
Acropora aspera is found in the Indian Ocean and western parts of the Pacific Ocean. It inhabits reef flats and lagoons and grows in water up to 5 metres (16 ft) deep. Where coral zoning occurs, it is found between the shallow water Acropora pulchra, which it closely resembles, and the deeper water Acropora millepora.

== Biology ==
Acropora aspera is a zooxanthellate coral which harbours symbiotic dinoflagellates in its tissues. The coral relies heavily on the energy produced during photosynthesis by these algae. In a study off the coast of southern India it was found that this coral grew by extension of the branches and by calcification of the skeleton all year round, but that calcification was reduced in June to September, the south-west monsoon season. This was thought to be due to the greater cloud cover and larger amount of suspended sediment during that season resulting in reduced levels of photosynthesis.

== Status ==
The IUCN Red List of Threatened Species lists Acropora aspera as being "endangered". This is becauseit is particularly prone to bleaching, a process in which high sea temperatures or stress cause the coral to expel its zooxanthellae and turn white. Other threats it faces are general destruction of coral reefs, ocean acidification, high sea temperatures and coral diseases. The crown-of-thorns starfish feeds preferentially on Acropora species corals. This starfish sometimes has sudden increases in population size which may threaten this coral locally.
