= Vasafua =

Island in Funafuti atoll, Tuvalu

Coordinates: 8°34′S 179°04′E

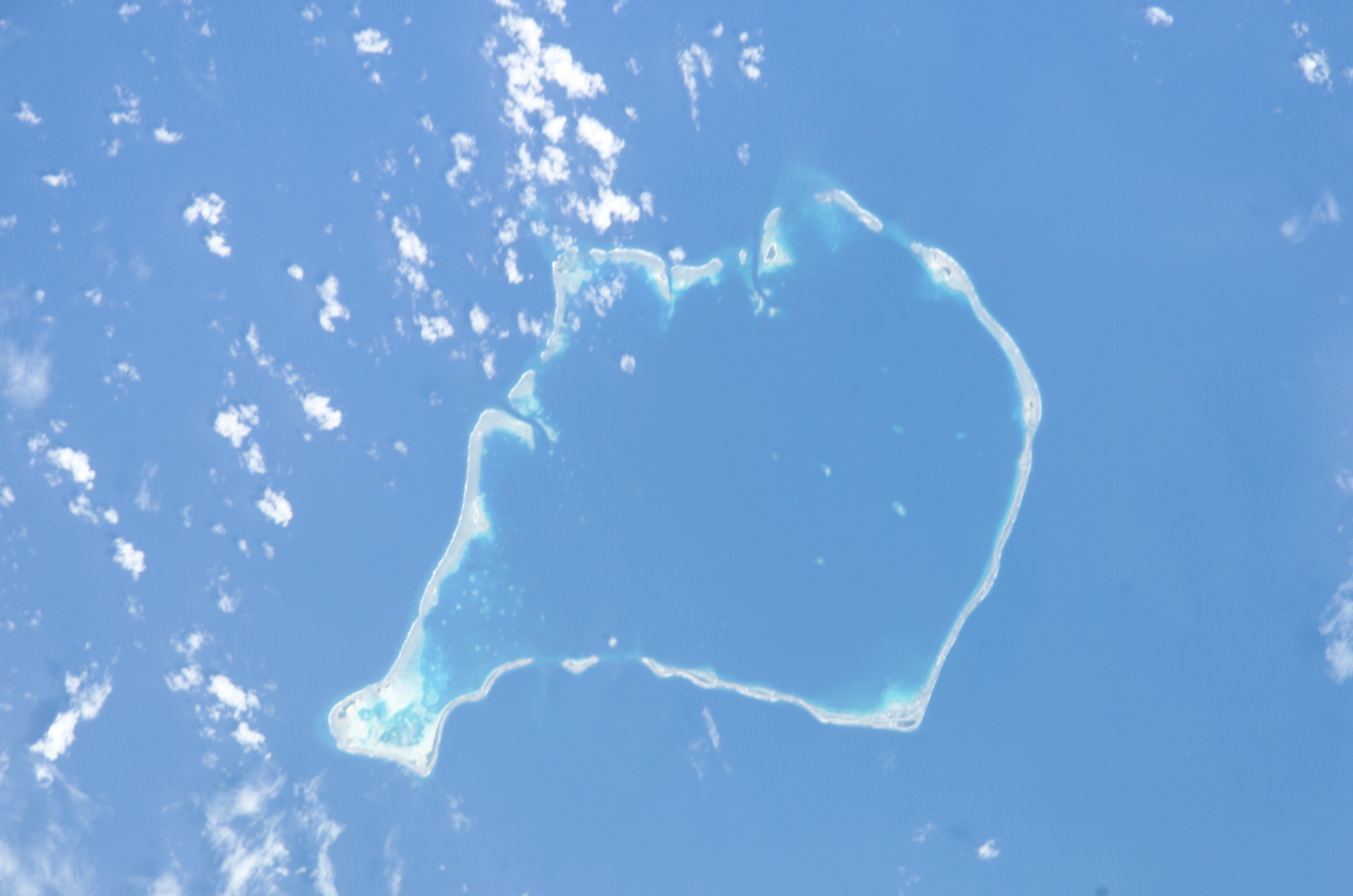
Funafuti from space

Vasafua is an islet of Funafuti, Tuvalu. Vasafua is part of the Funafuti Conservation Area, established in 1996 with the aim of preserving the natural fauna and flora of the area.

Vasafua was severely damaged by Cyclone Pam. The coconut palms were washed away, leaving the islet as a sand bar.

Te Ava Fuagea, also known as Ava Amelia, is a deep and narrow passage on the southwestern side of the atoll, 18.3 metres deep and 160 metres wide, separating the southern part of the atoll in the west, south of passage Te Ava Papa and the still more northerly islet of Fuafatu, and north of the islet of Vasafua.
