= Tepuka Vili Vili =

- Islet
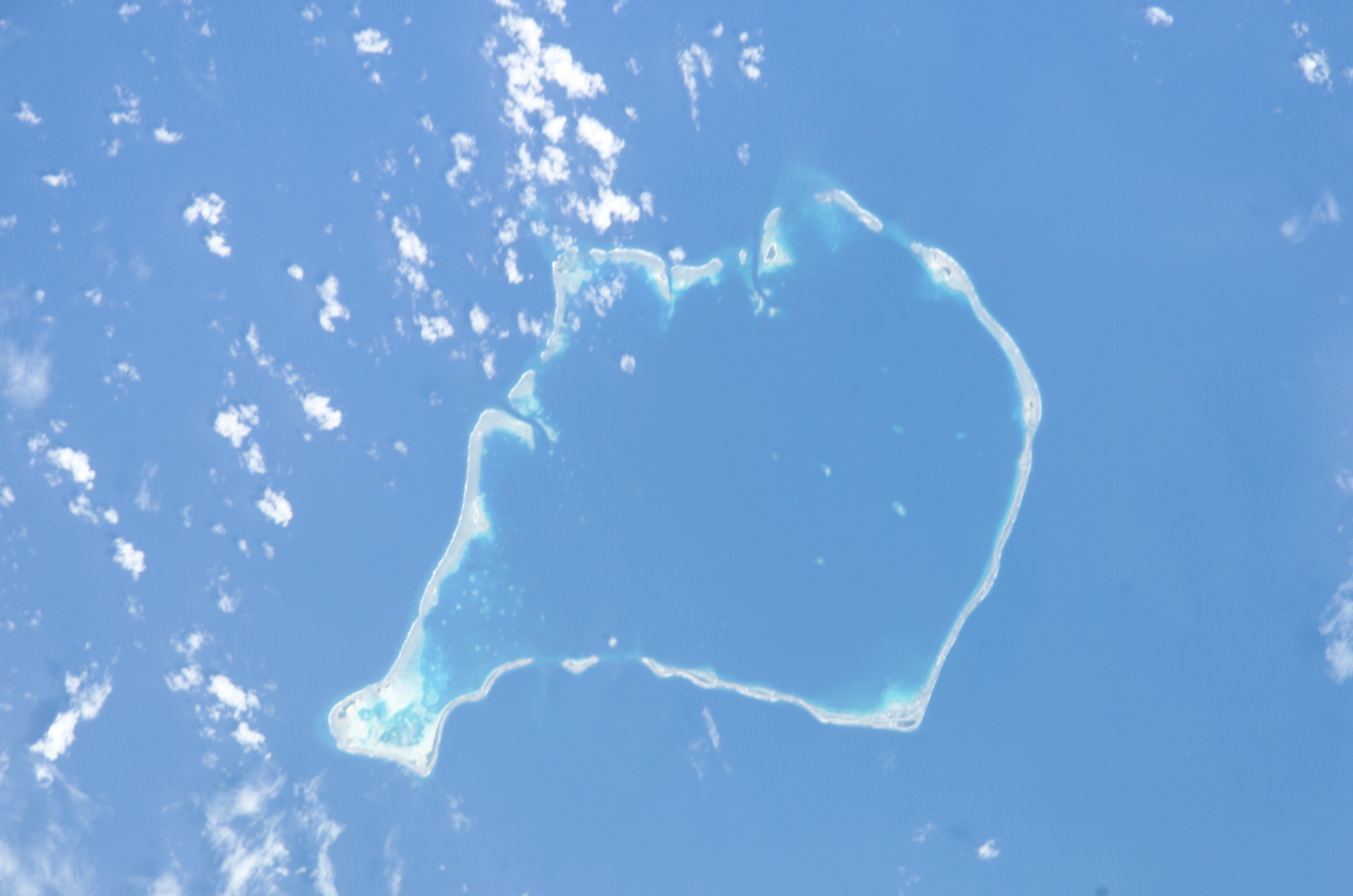
- Funafuti atoll

- Location in Tuvalu
- Coordinates: 8.467°S 179.083°E
- Country: Tuvalu

Tepuka Vili Vili, or Tepuka Savilivili, is an islet of Funafuti, Tuvalu.

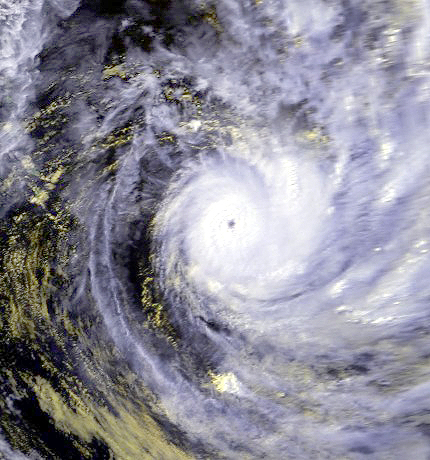
Cyclone Meli

Tepuka Vili Vili is part of the Funafuti Conservation Area, established in 1996 with the aim of preserving the natural fauna and flora of the area. Tepuka Vili Vili was devastated by Cyclone Keli in 1997, with all its vegetation and most of its sand swept away during the cyclone.

The islet is an example of dynamic action of a coral atoll changing with the effect of cyclones and wave action:

a net loss in area of 22 percent since 1896 is only part of the story. The island has undergone an almost constant reworking of its sedimentary material during the past century. It's grown longer (by 550 feet, or 170 meters) and narrower (by 390 feet, or 120 meters), and its position has rotated clockwise on the reef.

Te Ava Kum Kum is the passage through the Funafuti atoll in the middle of the western rim, south of Te Ava Tepuka Vili, between the islets of Tepuka Vili Vili to the north and Fualopa immediately south.
