= Fualefeke =

Island in Funafuti atoll, Tuvalu

Coordinates: 8.4274°S 179.1224°E

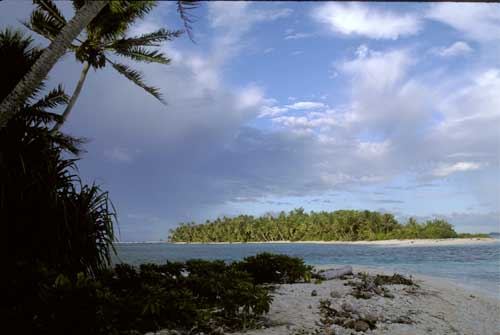
Fualifeke Islet

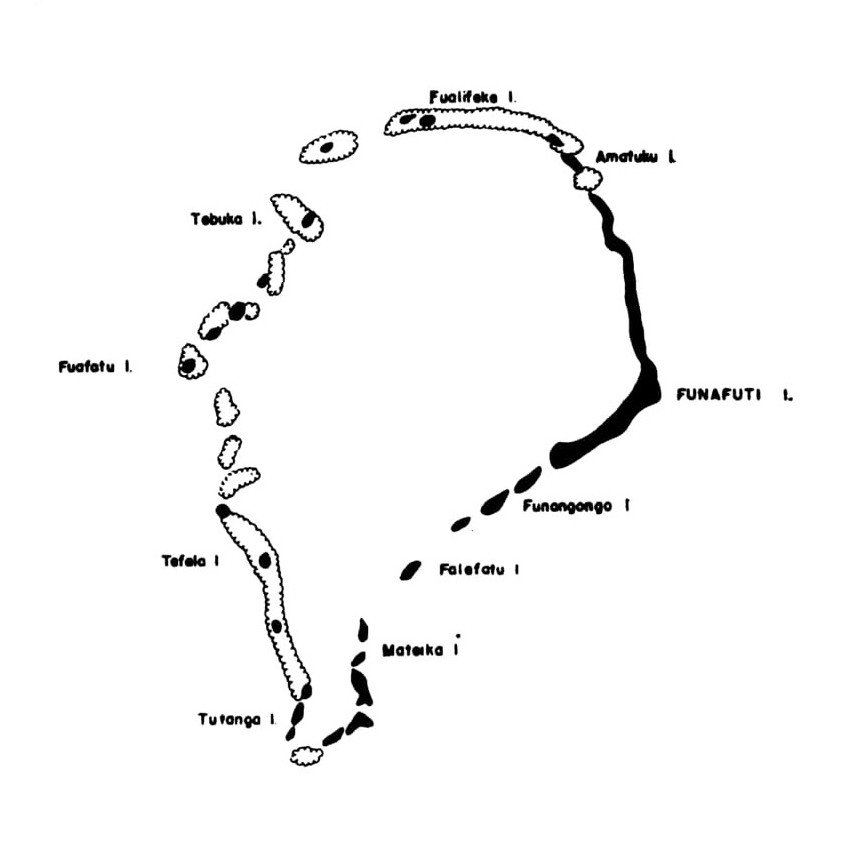
Map of Funafuti with Fualefeke on the top

Fualefeke is a small islet of Funafuti, Tuvalu. There are visible structures on Fualefeke.
