= Tefala =

- Islet
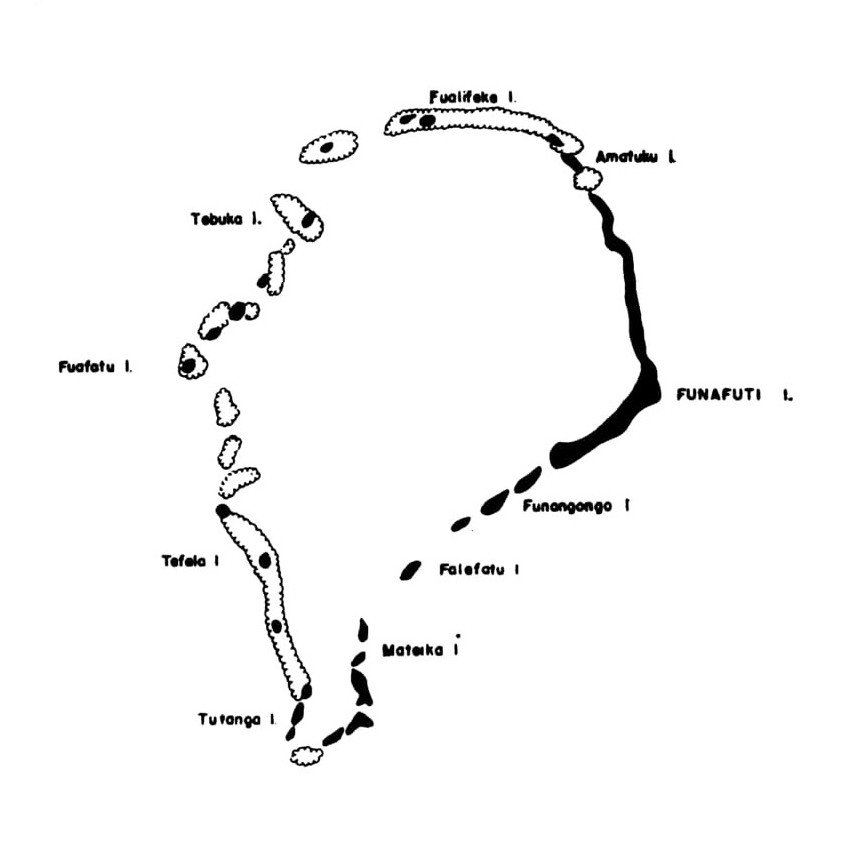
- Funafuti atoll with Tefala on the bottom left

- Location in Tuvalu
- Coordinates: 08°35′52.5″S 179°04′14″E
- Country: Tuvalu
- Atoll: Funafuti

Tefala is an islet of Funafuti, Tuvalu.

Tefala is part of the Funafuti Conservation Area, established in 1996 with the aim of preserving the natural fauna and flora of the area.
