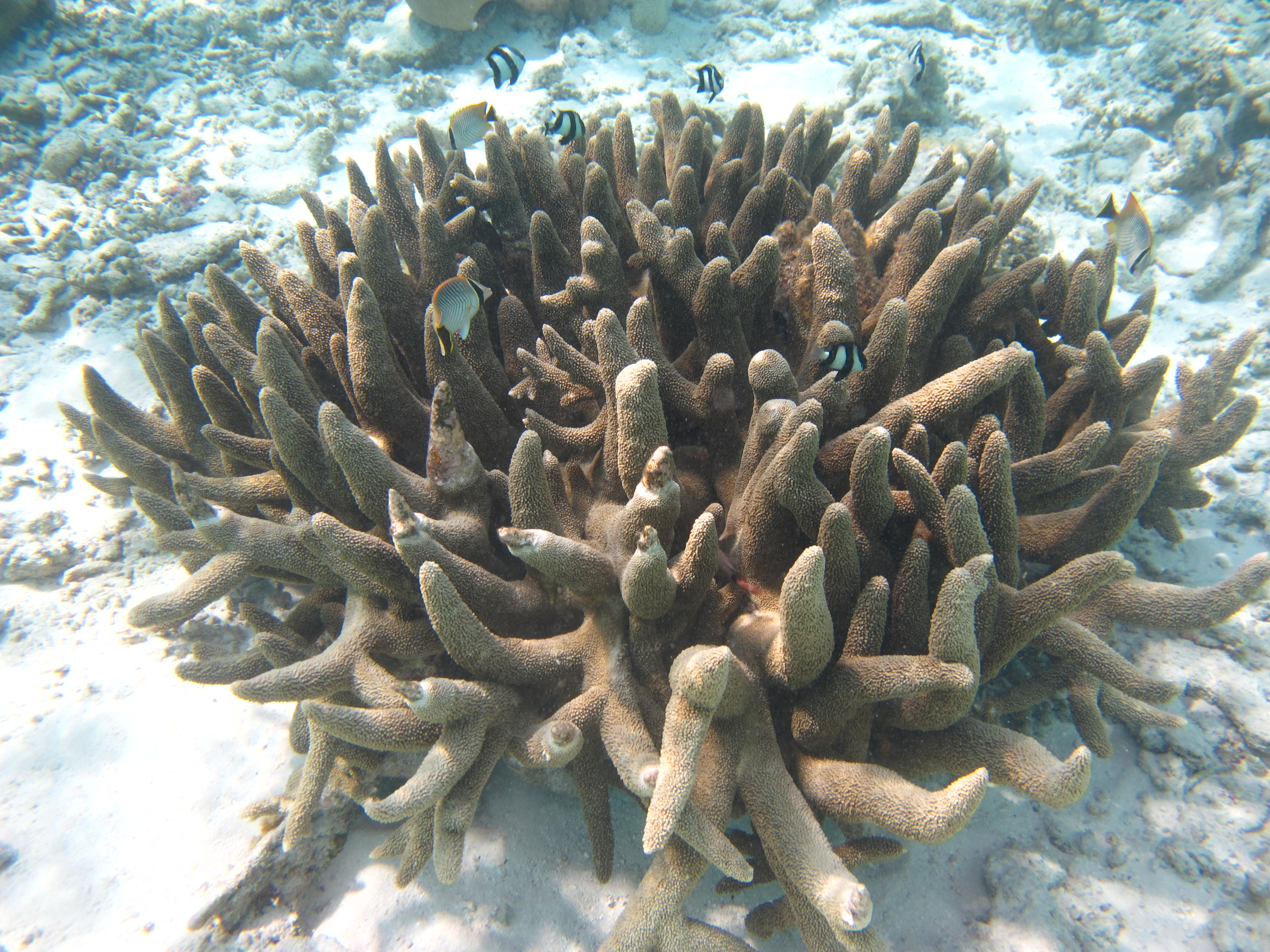

Conservation status
- Least Concern (IUCN 3.1)

Scientific classification
- Kingdom: Animalia
- Phylum: Cnidaria
- Subphylum: Anthozoa
- Class: Hexacorallia
- Order: Scleractinia
- Family: Acroporidae
- Genus: Acropora
- Species: A. robusta

Binomial name
- Acropora robusta (Dana, 1846)

Synonyms
- List: Acropora conigera (Dana, 1846); Acropora cuspidata (Dana, 1846); Acropora decipiens (Brook, 1892); Acropora nobilis (Dana, 1846); Acropora pacifica (Brook, 1891); Acropora paxilligera (Dana, 1846); Acropora pinguis Wells, 1950; Acropora ponderosa Nemenzo, 1967; Acropora smithi (Brook, 1893); Heteropora regalis Ehrenberg, 1834; Madrepora ambigua Brook, 1892; Madrepora brooki Bernard, 1900; Madrepora canalis Quelch, 1886; Madrepora conigera Dana, 1846; Madrepora cuspidata Dana, 1846; Madrepora cyclopea Dana, 1846; Madrepora decipiens Brook, 1892; Madrepora nobilis Dana, 1846; Madrepora pacifica Brook, 1891; Madrepora paxilligera Dana, 1846; Madrepora robusta Dana, 1846; Madrepora smithi Brook, 1893

= Acropora robusta =

Species of coral

Acropora robusta is a species of acroporid coral found in the Red Sea, the Gulf of Aden, the southwest and northern Indian Ocean, the central Indo-Pacific, Australia, Southeast Asia, Japan, the East China Sea and the oceanic west and central Pacific Ocean. It occurs in tropical shallow reefs, mainly along margins that are exposed to the action of strong waves, and can be found at depths from 1 to 8 metres (3 ft 3 in to 26 ft 3 in). It was described by Dana in 1846.

== Description ==
It occurs in irregular colonies consisting of thick branches towards the centre, but its outer branches are thinner. Its rasp-like radial corallites can be of a variety of diameters and shapes. The species pink- or yellow-brown, cream, or bright green with branches having pinkish ends.

== Distribution ==
It is classed as a least concern species on the IUCN Red List, but it is believed that its population is decreasing, and it is listed under Appendix II of CITES. Figures of its population are unknown, but is likely to be threatened by the global reduction of coral reefs, the increase of temperature causing coral bleaching, climate change, human activity, the crown-of-thorns starfish (Acanthaster planci) and disease. It occurs in the Red Sea, the Gulf of Aden, the southwest and northern Indian Ocean, the central Indo-Pacific, Australia, Southeast Asia, Japan, the East China Sea and the oceanic west and central Pacific Ocean. It is found at depths between 1 and 8 metres (3 ft 3 in and 26 ft 3 in) in tropical shallow reefs mostly along margins exposed to the actions of strong waves.

== Taxonomy ==
It was described as Madrepora robusta in 1846 by Dana.
