= Tengako =

Peninsula in Tuvalu

Coordinates: 8.4622°S 179.1853°E

Tengako is a peninsula at the north end of Fongafale islet of Funafuti, Tuvalu. At the end of the peninsula is Amatuku islet on which the Tuvalu Maritime Training Institute is located. Further past that is Mulitefala.

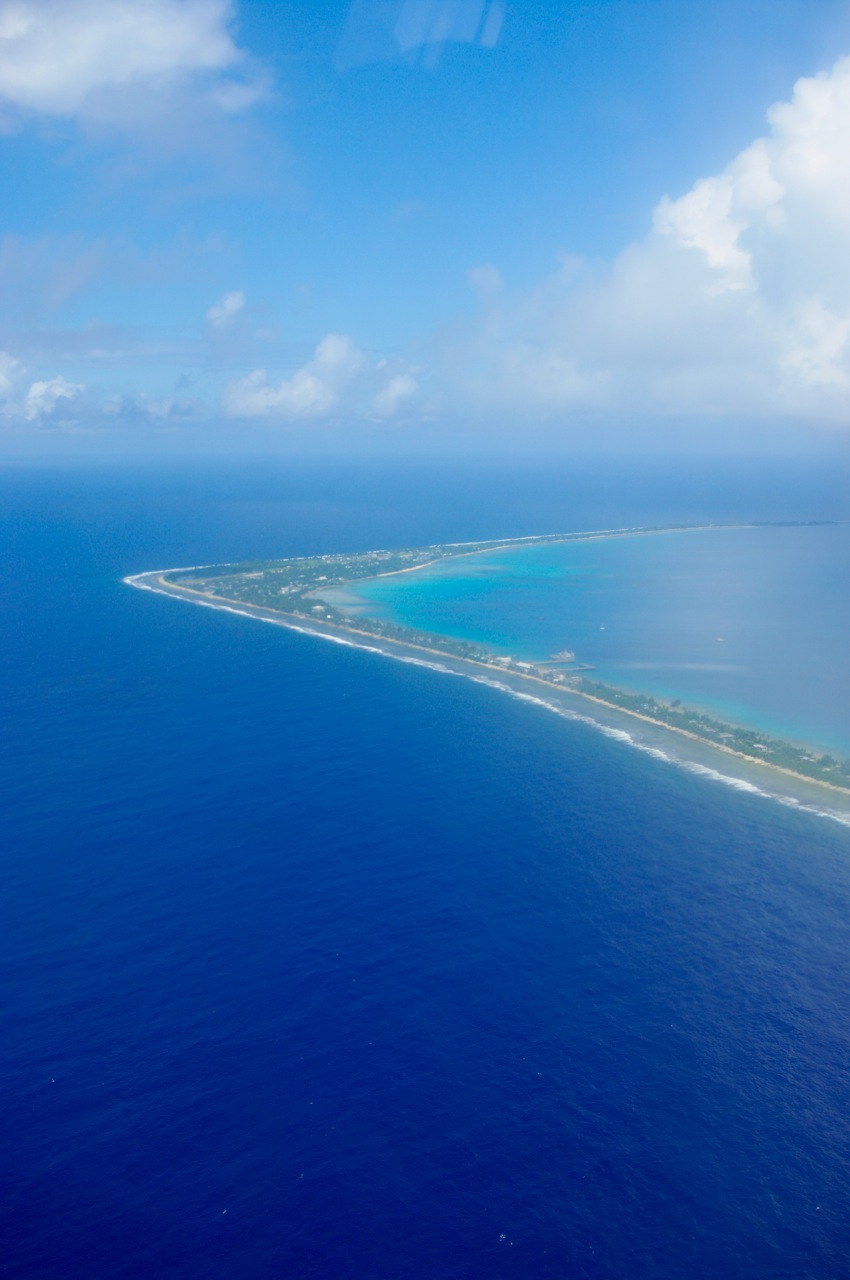
Aerial view of Tengako peninsula looking south to Fongafale
