= Tuvalu Overseas Seamen's Union =

- Tuvalu Overseas Seamen's Union
- Abbreviation: TOSU
- Type: Trade union
- Headquarters: Funafuti, Tuvalu
- Location: Tuvalu
- Field: Seafarers
- Members: 600
- General Secretary: Valo Valo
- Affiliations: International Transport Workers' Federation

The Tuvalu Overseas Seamen's Union (TOSU) is the only registered trade union in Tuvalu. It represents workers on foreign ships, and has a membership of 600.

The TOSU is affiliated with the International Transport Workers' Federation.

Tuvaluans are well known for their seafaring skills, with the Tuvalu Maritime Training Institute on Amatuku motu (island), Funafuti, providing training to approximately 120 marine cadets each year so that they have the skills necessary for employment as seafarers on merchant shipping. TMTI now operates under the Tuvalu Maritime Training Institute Act 2000.

A number of Tuvaluans are employed as merchant seamen on cargo ships on contracts of up to 12 months. The Asian Development Bank (ADB) estimates that 800 Tuvaluan men are trained, certified and active as seafarers. The ADB estimates that, at any one time, about 15 percent of the adult male population works abroad as seafarers. The Ahrenkiel Group of Germany is the shipping company that is the primary employer of Tuvaluan seafarers.

== Tuvaluan merchant mariners ==
The Tuvalu Marine Training Institute (TMTI) provides Tuvaluan men with eight months of training to provide the basic level of maritime qualifications necessary for employment in the international maritime industry. The 1991 census of Tuvalu identified 272 seaman working on merchant shipping. In 2002 the Tuvaluan Overseas Seaman's Union (TOSU) estimated the number as 417 seaman working on shipping. Remittances from seafarers is a major source of income for Tuvaluan families. However, the Great Recession impacted on export/import activities with a resulting drop in job opportunities for Tuvaluan seaman merchant shipping. In 2011 the Asian Development Bank (ADB) estimates there are 800 TMTI graduates registered for employment as seafarers. The ADB identify that the number of Tuvaluans employed as seafarers has decreased steadily from about 340 in 2001 to only 205 in 2010; so that of a total pool of 800 qualified seafarers, including those on leave, almost 450 were unemployed. This decline in seafarer employment has reduced remittances from $2.4 million in 2001 to a projected $1.2 million in 2010. The International Labour Organization (ILO) also estimates that in 2010 there were approximately 200 Tuvaluan seafarers on ships.

The International Monetary Fund 2014 Country Report described the effect of the 2008 financial crisis as reducing demand for the services of Tuvaluan seafarers. As of October 2013, there were about 112 Tuvalu seafarers working on cargo ships, compared to 361 in 2006. The consequence is that remittances from seafarers to their families in Tuvalu fell by about 9 percent of GDP for Tuvalu. In 2012 remittances from seafarers amounted to 10 percent of GDP in Tuvalu.

Tuvaluan seafarers compete with seafarers from Kiribati and South and Southeast Asian countries. There are higher transport costs for Tuvaluan and I-Kiribati seafarers to travel to take up positions of ships put them as a disadvantage as compared to other seafarers. Structural changes to merchant shipping industry have occurred following the 2008 financial crisis with the industry suffering low profitability and overcapacity. The increasing automation of ship operations has also reduced the demand for Tuvaluan seafarers.

== Additional sources ==
- ICTUR; et al., eds. (2005). Trade Unions of the World (6th ed.). London, UK: John Harper Publishing. ISBN 0-9543811-5-7.
