= Nukusavalevale =

- Islet
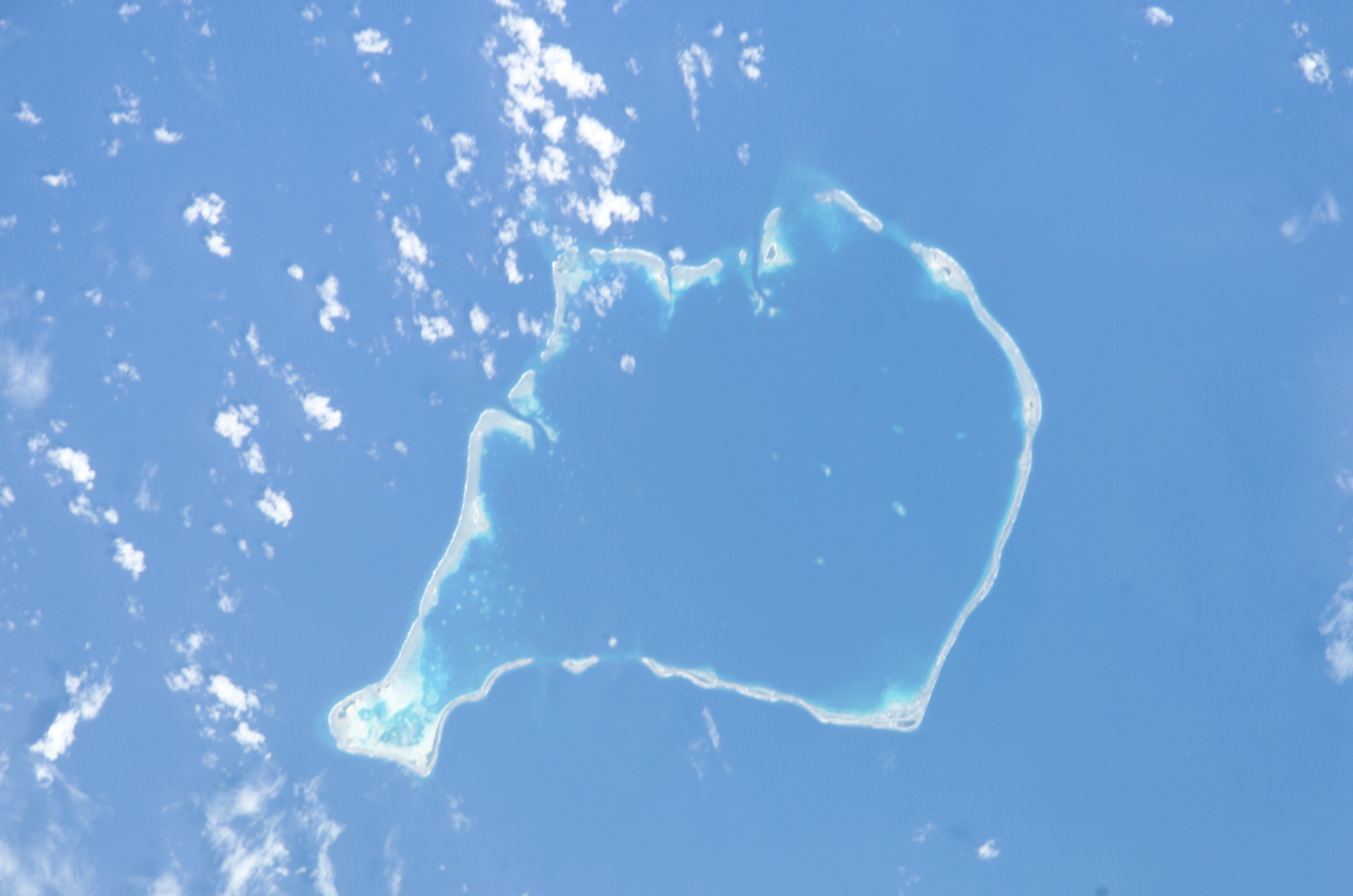
- Funafuti atoll

- Location in Tuvalu
- Coordinates: 08°31′S 179°12′E
- Country: Tuvalu

Nukusavalevale is an islet of Funafuti, Tuvalu. It lies on the southeastern rim of the atoll, south of Motuloa.
