= Tuvalu Atoll Science Technology Training Institute =

Tuvalu Atoll Science Technology Training Institute (TASTII)
- Type: public
- Established: 20 December 2017
- Location: Tuvalu; 08°31′S 179°12′E
- Campus: Fongafale

Tuvalu Atoll Science Technology Training Institute (TASTII) is a tertiary institution that offers technical and vocational education on Funafuti atoll in Tuvalu.

Prime Minister Enele Sopoaga as Minister for Public Utilities and Infrastructures launched TASTTI on 20 December 2017. Sopoaga described TASTTI as part of the national strategies of Tuvalu “to provide high quality education; to equip people with hands-on knowledge and skills to develop more self-reliance, as well as resilience against the impacts of climate change”, and referred to the effects on the atolls of Tuvalu of Cyclone Pam in 2015 as driving the effort to build resilience against the impacts of climate change.

Tuvalu Atoll Science Technology Training Institute (TASTII) is one of four tertiary institutions offering technical and vocational courses. The others are Tuvalu Maritime Training Institute (TMTI), Australian Pacific Training Coalition (APTC) and University of the South Pacific (USP) Extension Centre. Technical and Vocational Skills Development (TVSD) in Tuvalu is supported by the Australian Pacific Training Coalition (APTC).
