= Vaiaku =

- Village
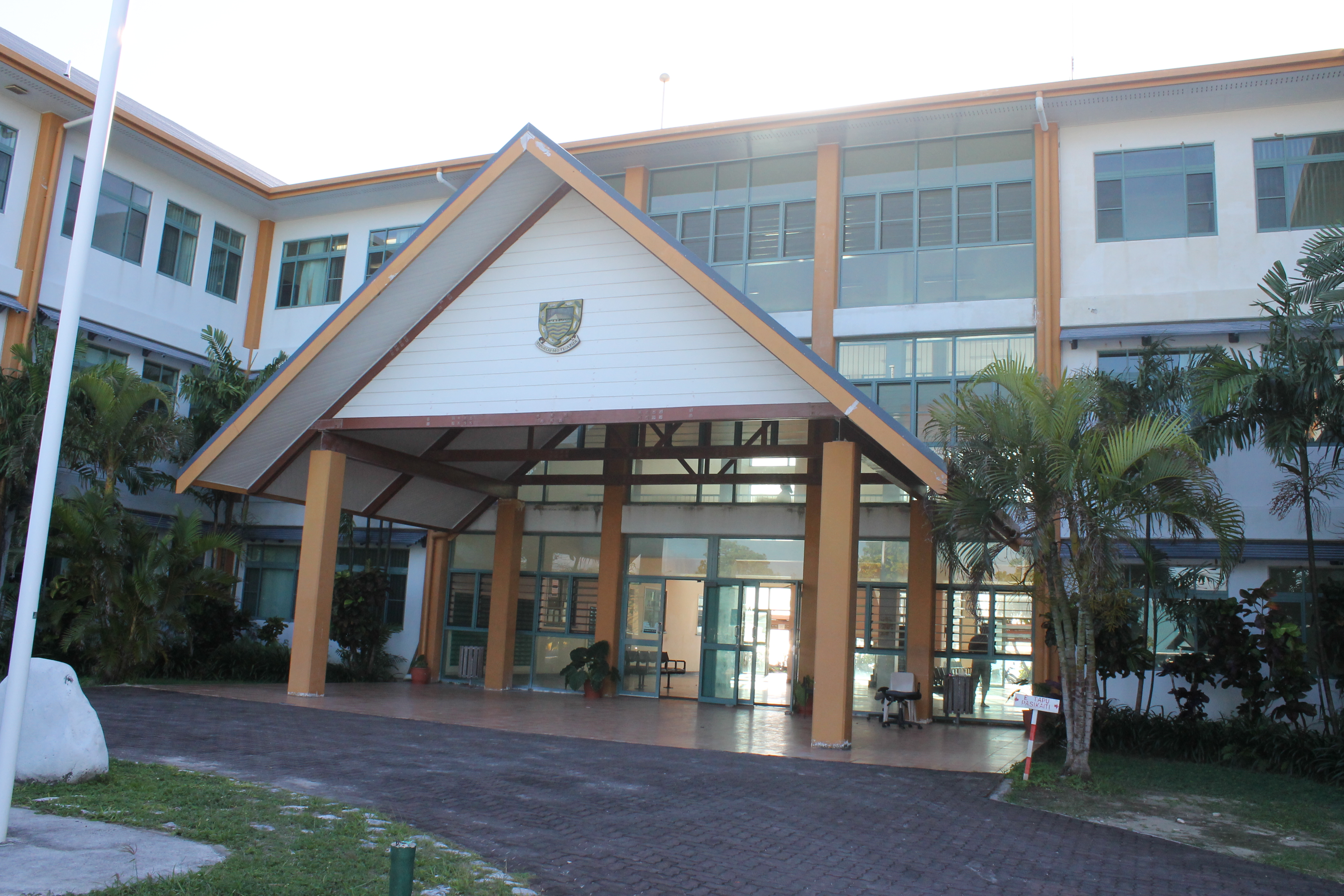
- Tuvaluan Parliament Chamber

- Location in Tuvalu
- Coordinates: 08°31′16″S 179°11′54″E
- Country: Tuvalu
- Atoll: Funafuti
- Island: Fongafale

Area
  - Total: 0.11 km^{2} (0.042 sq mi)
- Elevation: 0 m (0 ft)

Population (2017)
  - Total: 462
  - Density: 4,200/km^{2} (11,000/sq mi)

Vaiaku is a village located on the southern coast of the island of Fongafale in the atoll of Funafuti in Tuvalu, which is home to most of the major administrative buildings. However, it is not the official capital, as that title belongs to the entirety of Funafuti.

According to the census of 2017, Vaiaku has 462 inhabitants, out of 6,320 for the whole atoll of Funafuti, which is the official capital of Tuvalu.

All the administrative buildings, including the National Bank of Tuvalu, and the only hotel of Tuvalu, Vaiaku Langi Hotel, are located in Vaiaku. It also has Teone Church, which is the only church of the Latin Catholic Mission Sui Iuris of Funafuti. The most prominent building on Funafuti is the Fētu'ao Lima (Morning Star Church) of the Church of Tuvalu.

== Climate ==
Vaiaku has a tropical rainforest climate (Af) with heavy to very heavy rainfall year-round.

Climate data for Vaiaku
| Month | Jan | Feb | Mar | Apr | May | Jun | Jul | Aug | Sep | Oct | Nov | Dec | Year |
|---|---|---|---|---|---|---|---|---|---|---|---|---|---|
| Mean daily maximum °C (°F) | 31.2 (88.2) | 31.1 (88.0) | 31.0 (87.8) | 31.1 (88.0) | 31.1 (88.0) | 30.7 (87.3) | 30.5 (86.9) | 30.6 (87.1) | 30.9 (87.6) | 31.0 (87.8) | 31.2 (88.2) | 31.2 (88.2) | 31.0 (87.8) |
| Daily mean °C (°F) | 28.1 (82.6) | 28.0 (82.4) | 28.0 (82.4) | 28.1 (82.6) | 28.2 (82.8) | 28.1 (82.6) | 27.9 (82.2) | 27.9 (82.2) | 28.0 (82.4) | 28.0 (82.4) | 28.1 (82.6) | 28.1 (82.6) | 28.0 (82.5) |
| Mean daily minimum °C (°F) | 25.1 (77.2) | 25.0 (77.0) | 25.1 (77.2) | 25.2 (77.4) | 25.4 (77.7) | 25.5 (77.9) | 25.3 (77.5) | 25.2 (77.4) | 25.2 (77.4) | 25.1 (77.2) | 25.1 (77.2) | 25.1 (77.2) | 25.2 (77.4) |
| Average precipitation mm (inches) | 395 (15.6) | 343 (13.5) | 338 (13.3) | 268 (10.6) | 247 (9.7) | 218 (8.6) | 252 (9.9) | 253 (10.0) | 222 (8.7) | 259 (10.2) | 278 (10.9) | 410 (16.1) | 3,483 (137.1) |
Source: Climate-Data.org
