= Mateiko =

Mateiko may refer to:

- Daniel Mateiko, Kenyan long-distance runner
- Eriks Mateiko, Latvian ice hockey player
- Alternative name of Mateika, uninhabited islet of Funafuti, Tuvalu

== See also ==
- Matejko (surname)
