= Fakaifou =

- Village
- Location in Tuvalu
- Coordinates: 8.5171°S 179.2009°E
- Country: Tuvalu
- Atoll: Funafuti
- Island: Fongafale

Population
  - Total: 1,007

Fakaifou is a village on the island of Fongafale in Funafuti atoll. It has a population of 1,007.
