= Tekavatoetoe =

Tekvatoetoe
- Village
- Location in Tuvalu
- Coordinates: 8.5333°S 179.1867°E
- Country: Tuvalu
- Atoll: Funafuti
- Island: Fongafale

Population
  - Total: 773

Tekavatoetoe is a village on the island of Fongafale in Funafuti atoll. It has a population of 773.
