= Falaoigo =

Islet in Funafuti atoll, Tuvalu

Coordinates: 8.6251°S 179.079°E

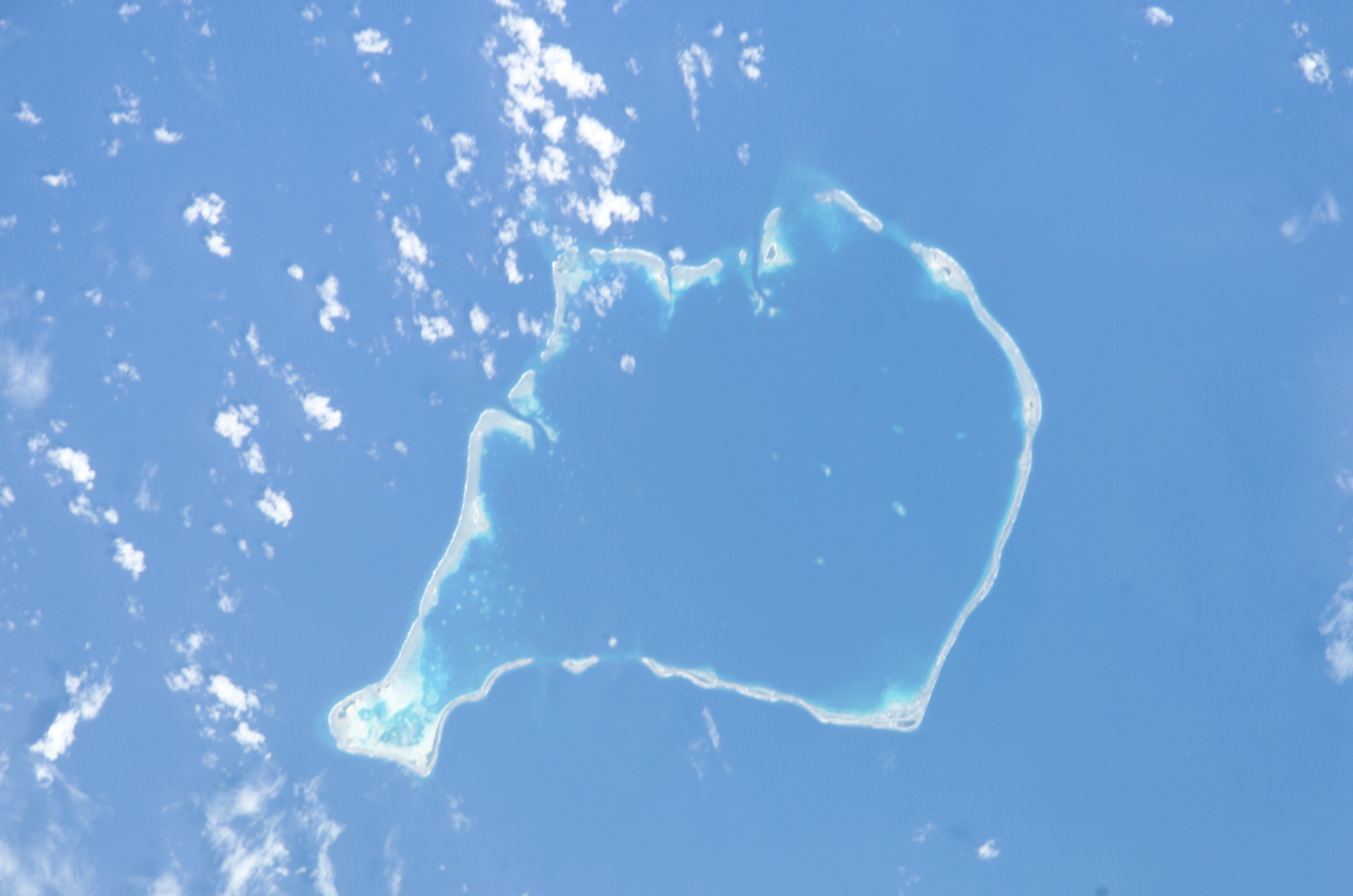
An Aerial image of Funafuti Atoll which Falaoigo is a part of.

Falaoigo is an uninhabited islet of Funafuti, Tuvalu. It is located in the southwestern part of the atoll next to Tutanga another one of the islets in the atoll. On Google Earth it is labeled as "Te Afuafou".

== See also ==
- Desert island
- List of islands
