= Senala =

Senua
- Village
- Location in Tuvalu
- Coordinates: 08°31′16″S 179°11′54″E
- Country: Tuvalu
- Atoll: Funafuti
- Island: Fongafale

Population (2010)
  - Total: 215

Senala is a village in Tuvalu, located on the Funafuti atoll, on the island of Fongafale. The settlement has an area of 0.13 km^{2}. In 2001, it was inhabited by 574 people, and by 1207 in 2012.
