= Teone =

- Village
- Location in Tuvalu
- Coordinates: 8.4992°S 179.1950°E
- Country: Tuvalu
- Atoll: Funafuti
- Island: Fongafale

Population
  - Total: 540

Teone is a village on the island of Fongafale in Funafuti atoll. Its population is 540.
