= Fatato =

Islet in Funafuti atoll, Tuvalu

Coordinates: 8°32′52″S 179°09′42″E

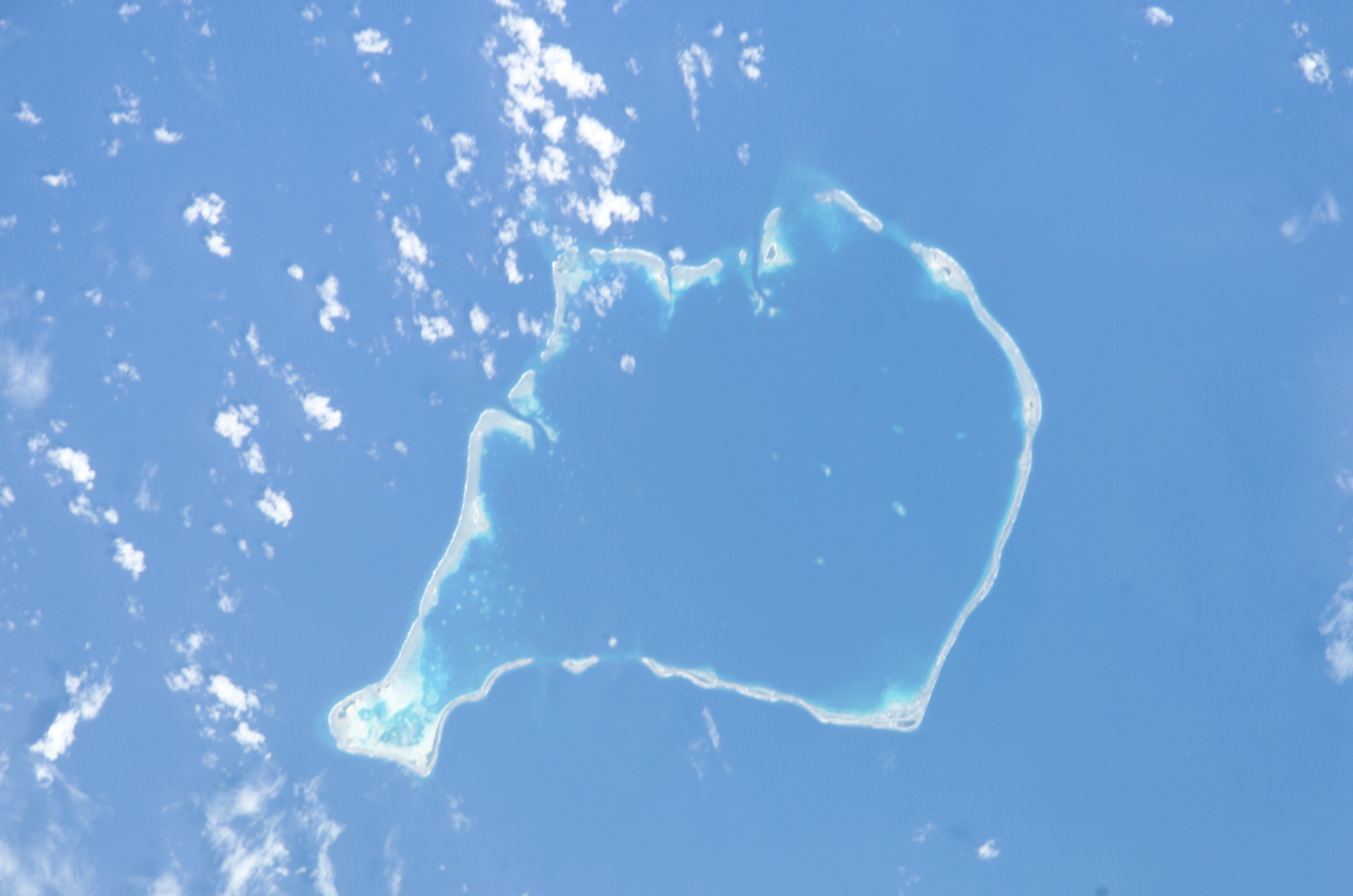
Funafuti (Tuvalu) from space

Fatato is an uninhabited islet (motu) of Funafuti, Tuvalu. In 2002 the Asia-Pacific Network for Global Change Research (APN) chose this island for a systematic study of its coast in relation to the impact of global climate change on atolls. The islet can be accessed by foot with a 20-30 minute walk from Fongafale across the reef at low tide.

== See also ==
- Desert island
- List of islands
