= Lofeagai =

- Village
- Location in Tuvalu
- Coordinates: 8.4810°S 179.2009°E
- Country: Tuvalu
- Atoll: Funafuti
- Island: Fongafale

Population
  - Total: 399

Lofeagai is a village on the island of Fongafale in Funafuti atoll. It has a population of 399.
