= Avalau =

Island in Funafuti atoll, Tuvalu

Coordinates: 8.6396°S 179.0748°E

Avalau is an islet within the atoll of Funafuti, Tuvalu. Charles Hedley described Avalau in 1896 "this islet is said to possess a spring of fresh water".
