= Papa Elise =

Island in Funafuti atoll, Tuvalu

Coordinates: 8.5578°S 179.1465°E

Papa Elise is an islet of Funafuti, Tuvalu. The name Papa Elise is a translation of Father Ellice, and refers to a missionary who came to Funafuti in the late 19th century.
