= Harry Clifford Fassett =

Harold Clifford Fassett
- Born: May 9, 1870; Contra Costa County, California, U.S.
- Died: December 9, 1953 (aged 83); San Francisco, California, U.S.
- Occupations: mapmaker, photographer and fisheries expert
- Parent(s): Harris Harding Fassett and Emma Louise Neal

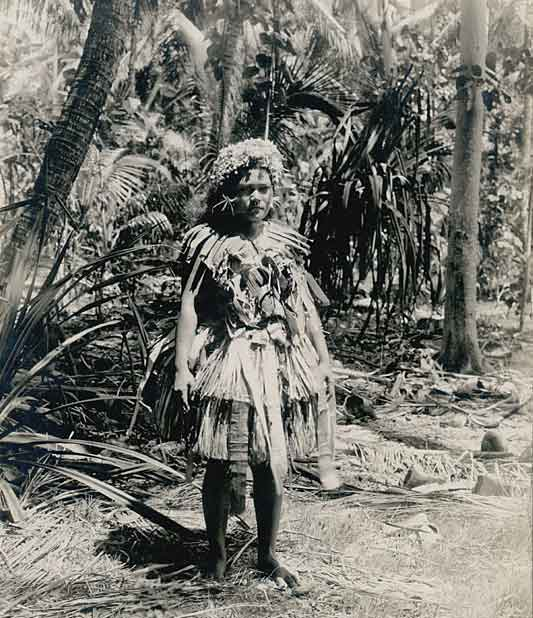
Woman on Funafuti, Tuvalu, then known as Ellice Islands. H. C. Fassett (1900)

Harry Clifford Fassett (May 9,1870 – December 9, 1953) worked for the United States Fish Commission and later the United States Bureau of Fisheries. He became an expert on the salmon fisheries in Alaska and was also a map-maker and photographer.

Fassett was born May 9, 1870, in Contra Costa County, California. He married Myra Beck in 1919. Harry and Myra Fassett were residents of San Francisco from 1934 and Harry Fassett was member of California Academy of Sciences from 1945 until his death on December 9, 1953.

== Early career with the United States Fish Commission ==
In 1889 Fassett jointed USFC Albatross as a captain's clerk. In 1893 and 1894 Fassett was engaged in chart-making on the Northern fur seal and fishery investigations carried out by the United States Fish Commission on USFC Albatross. His duties expanded to include photography using a glass-plate camera on the Alaskan salmon research cruises conducted from 1894 to 1897.

As captain's clerk on the 1889-1900 Pacific cruise of USFC Albatross conducted by the United States Fish Commission, Fassett was engaged in chart making and photography; recording people, communities and scenes during this voyage using a glass-plate camera. USFC Albatross sailed from San Francisco on 23 August 1899, into the South and Central Pacific, visiting the Marquesas, Paumotu, Society Islands, Cook Islands, Tonga, Fiji, Ellice Islands, Gilbert Islands, Marshall Islands, Caroline Islands and the Ladrone Islands. The ship visited Japan, departing Yokohama on 2 June 1900 to visit Hakodate, Japan, and Kamchatka, north of the Aleutian Islands, and collected biological specimens in the North Pacific and into the Bering Sea and ultimately returned to San Francisco on 30 October 1900 after a cruise of 14 months.

== Later career with the United States Bureau of Fisheries ==
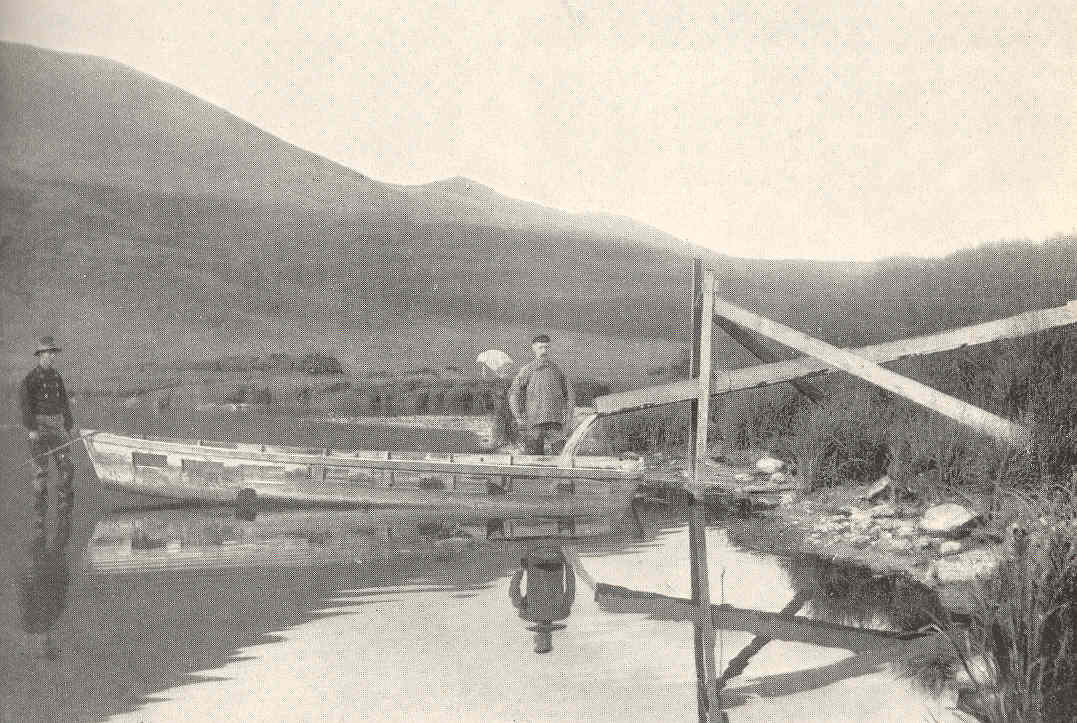

In 1902, the United States Fish Commission was reorganized as the United States Bureau of Fisheries and was made part of the newly created United States Department of Commerce and Labor. By 1907 Fassett is titled in official publications as a fishery expert, and participated in the Albatross Philippine Expedition, from 16 October 1907 to 4 May 1910, conducted by the United States Bureau of Fisheries and the Smithsonian Institution, under Commander Marbury Johnston and Hugh McCormick Smith, Deputy Commissioner of Fisheries, Director of the Expedition.

From 1911 to 1919, Fassett represented the United States Bureau of Fisheries in Alaska and was involved in further salmon research in Alaska and the Pribilof Islands fur seal investigations.

== Legacy ==
Two topographical features of Alaska are named in his honor: Fassett Point on Kodiak Island and a glacier near Yakutat, Alaska.
