= Motugie =

Island in Funafuti atoll, Tuvalu

Coordinates: 8.6426°S 179.08088°E

Motugie is an islet of Funafuti, Tuvalu.
