= Tengasu =

Islet in Funafuti atoll, Tuvalu

Coordinates: 8.633°S 179.0758°E

Tengasu is an uninhabited islet of Funafuti, Tuvalu.

== See also ==
- Desert island
- List of islands
