= Motuloa (Funafuti) =

- Location in Funafuti

Geography
- Location: South Pacific
- Coordinates: 8.6416°S 179.0860°E

Administration
- Tuvalu

Motuloa is an islet in the atoll of Funafuti, Tuvalu. Motu loa means long island. It lies on the southeastern rim of the atoll and is 800 metres (0.50 mi) long northeast–southwest, but only 50 metres (160 ft) wide. It is only about 25 metres (82 ft) southwest of Telele and can be reached by foot from it during low tide. The islet is densely vegetated.
