= Mulitefala =

Island in Funafuti atoll, Tuvalu

Coordinates: 8°26′04″S 179°10′00″E

Mulitefala is an islet of Funafuti, Tuvalu. The islet is home to an inn known as Afelita's Island Resort. Mulitefala is an 8 minute boat ride from Amatuku Jetty. It is sometimes also called Pandanus island.
