= Luamotu =

Islet in Funafuti atoll, Tuvalu

Coordinates: 8.6095°S 179.0991°E

Luamotu is uninhabited islet of Funafuti, Tuvalu.

== See also ==
- Desert island
- List of islands
