= Funafala =

Island in Funafuti atoll, Tuvalu

Coordinates: 8.6281°S 179.1016°E

Funafala is an islet of Funafuti, Tuvalu that is inhabited by five families, with a church also located on the islet. Funafala means 'the pandanus of Funa', the name of a chief, after whom also the group has been named Funafuti.

== Cyclones of 1883 & 1972 ==
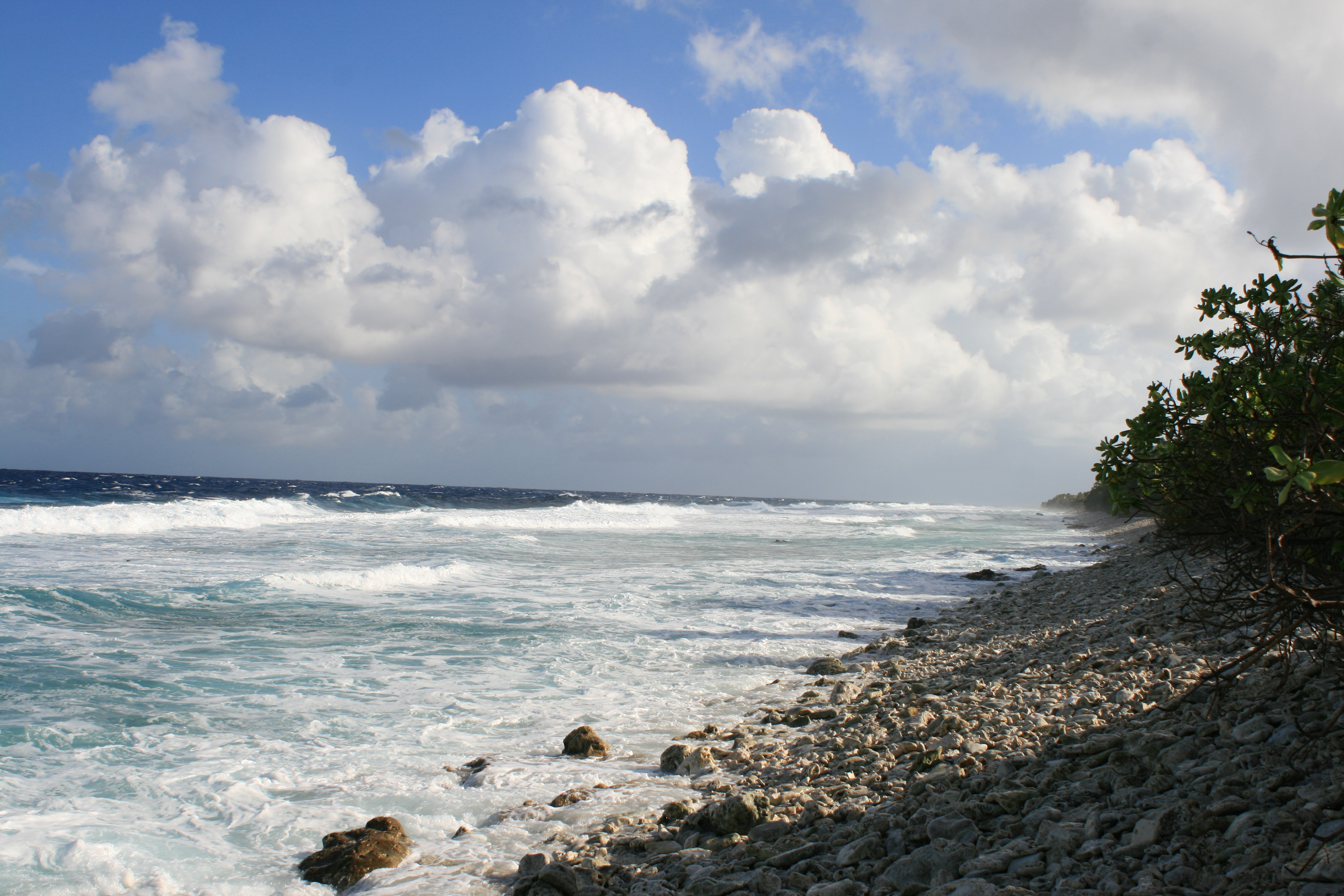
Ocean side of Funafuti atoll showing the storm dunes, the highest point on the atoll.

George Westbrook, a trader on Funafuti, recorded a cyclone, that struck Funafuti in 1883. At the time the cyclone struck, he was the sole inhabitant of Fongafale; Tema, the Samoan missionary, had taken everyone else to Funafala to work on erecting a church. The buildings on Fongafale were destroyed, including the church and the trade stores of George Westbrook and Alfred Restieaux. Little damage had occurred at Funafala, and the people returned to rebuild at Fongafale.

In 1972, Funafuti was in the path of Cyclone Bebe. Tropical Cyclone Bebe was a pre-season tropical cyclone that impacted the Gilbert, Ellice Islands, and Fiji island groups. First spotted on October 20, the system intensified and grew in size through October 22. Cyclone Bebe continued through Sunday 22 October. Cyclone Bebe knocked down 90% of the houses and trees on the island, and the storm surge created a wall of coral rubble along the ocean side of Fongafale and Funafala that was about 10 miles (16 km) long, and about 10 feet (3.0 m) to 20 feet (6.1 m) thick at the bottom. As a result of the system's storm surge and flooding, drinking water sources across the island were contaminated.

== World War II ==
During the Pacific War, the majority of Tuvaluans living on Fongafale atoll moved to Funafala, as Fongafale became a base for the American forces who occupied much of Fongafale islet. The hospital was also shifted to Funafala islet for the duration of the war.
