= Te Afuafou =

Island in Funafuti atoll, Tuvalu

Coordinates: 8.6372°S 179.0742°E

Te Afuafou is an islet of Funafuti, Tuvalu. Charles Hedley in 1896 describes the meaning of the name 'Te afua fou' as being 'the new beginning':

the name refers to an unfortunate incident in connection with their first contact with the white man, and their first knowledge of the deadly firearms of the foreigner. A vessel called at the mouth of the lagoon, and the natives were allowed on board. On leaving one of them stole a bucket. The canoe. containing the thief was pursued, and, to the astonishment and dismay of the company, the man in pursuit was able to produce lightning and thunder and to inflict death.
