= Amatuku =

Islet of Funafuti, Tuvalu

Coordinates: 8°26′19″S 179°10′17″E

Amatuku is an islet of Funafuti, Tuvalu on which the Tuvalu Maritime Training Institute is located. Access to Amatuku is from Tengako, which is the peninsula at the north end of Fongafale islet.
