= Mateika =

Islet in Funafuti atoll, Tuvalu

Coordinates: 8°36′08″S 179°05′59.5″E

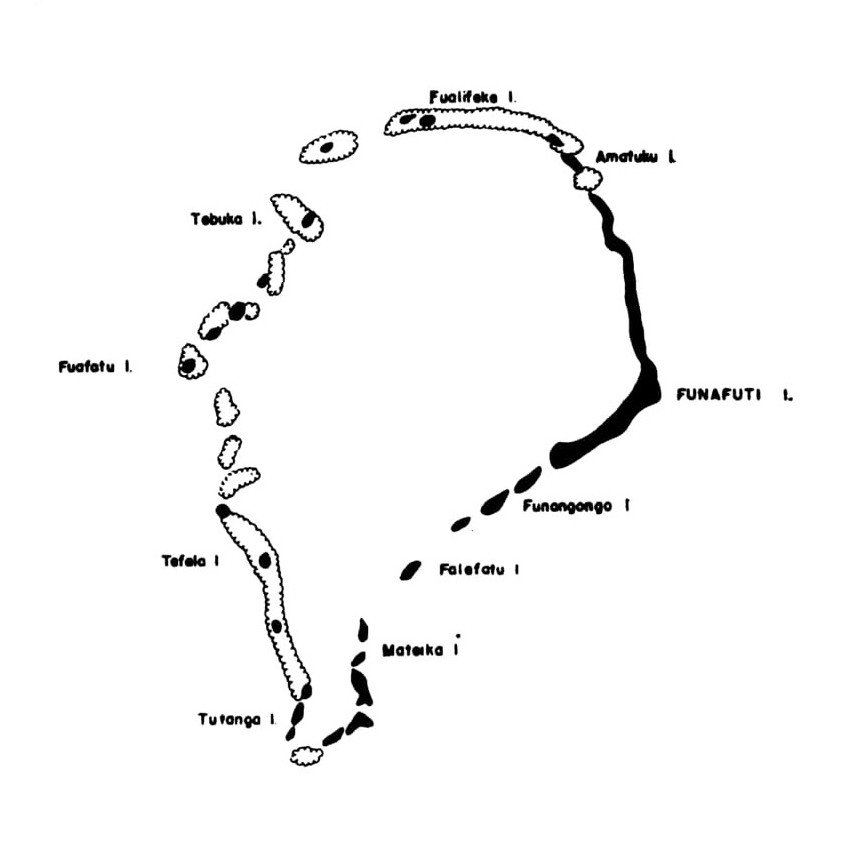
Map of Funafuti with Mateika on the bottom left

Mateika or Mateiko is an uninhabited islet of Funafuti, Tuvalu.

== See also ==
- Desert island
- List of islands
