= Telele =

Islet in Funafuti atoll, Tuvalu

Coordinates: 8.6339°S 179.0984°E

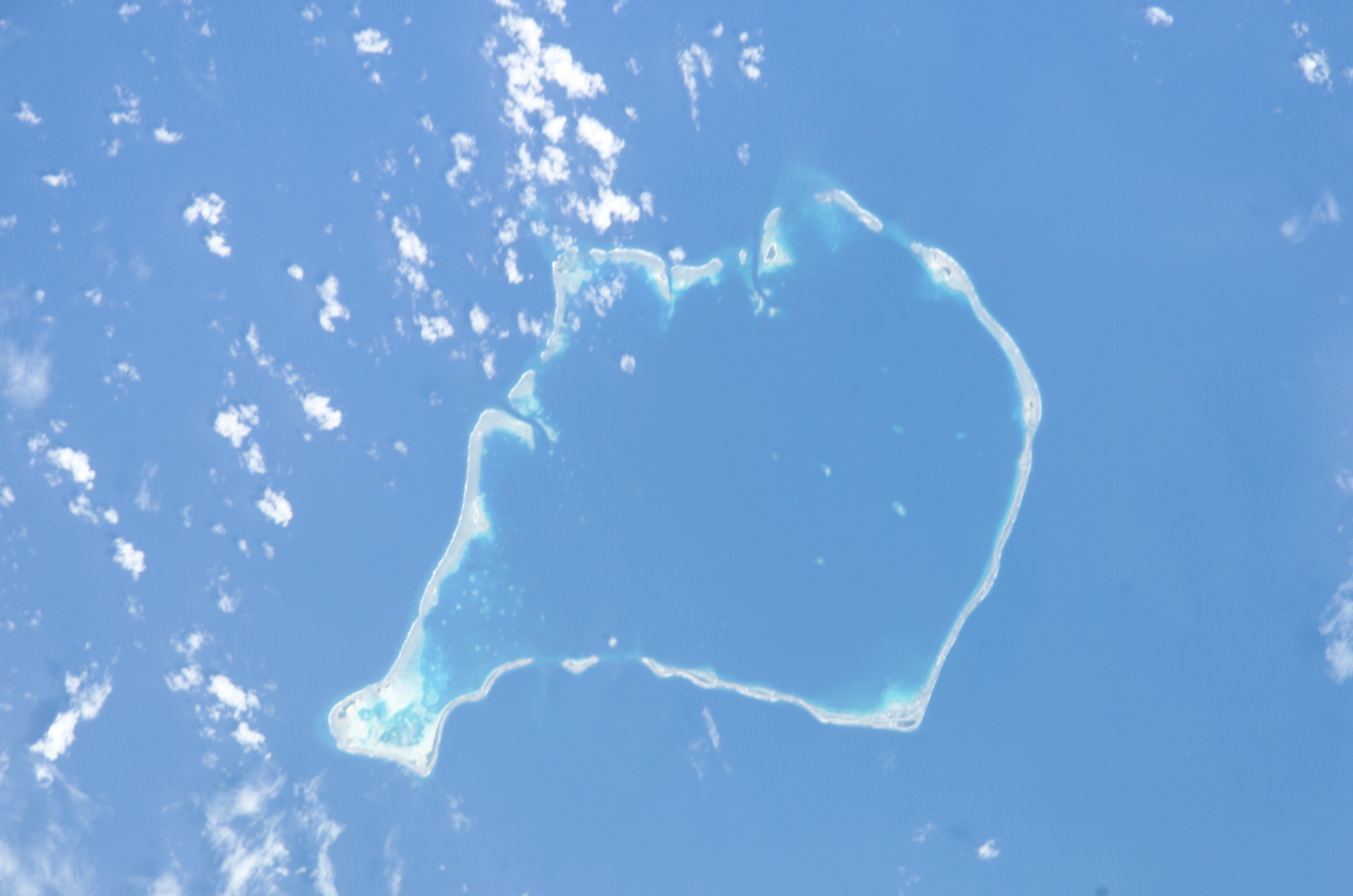
Funafuti seen from space

Telele is an uninhabited islet of Funafuti, Tuvalu. The estimate terrain elevation of the island is 12 metres above sea level.

== See also ==
- Desert island
- List of islands
