= Tutanga =

Islet in Funafuti atoll, Tuvalu

Coordinates: 8.6275°S 179.0782°E

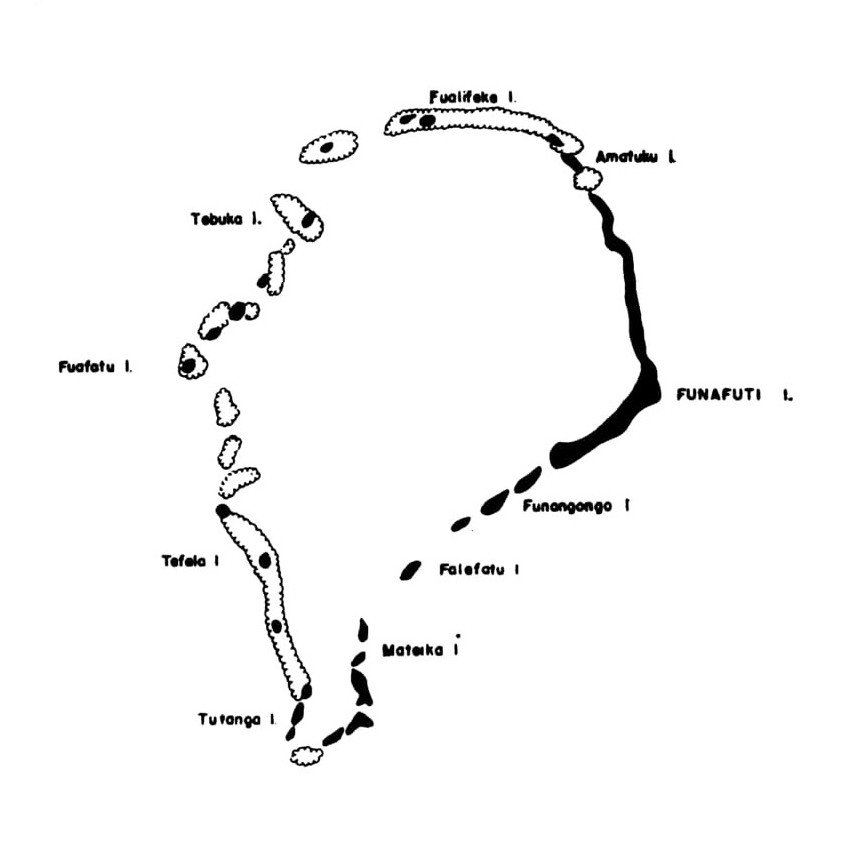
Map of Funafuti with Tutanga on the bottom left

Tutanga is an uninhabited islet which is the most southern islet of Funafuti, Tuvalu. This islet has also been called Tuaeriki.

In 1896 Professor Professor William Sollas went to Funafuti as the leader of the Funafuti Coral Reef Boring Expedition of the Royal Society; Prof. Sollas subsequently published The Legendary History of Funafuti, an oral history given by Erivara, the chief of Funafuti, through the trader Jack O’Brien, (as translator) which began:

THE first king of Funafuti was Terematua (? Tilimatua), but who he was or where he came from is not known; it is certain, however, he was here before the arrival of the Kauga, people who swam to this island from Samoa, which means, I take it, Samoans who were wrecked from a canoe and afterwards swam ashore. The Kauga were much respected. Toa, a piece of land in Funafuti, is named after one of them, and the southernmost island, Tuaeriki, after another : after death they were worshipped as spirits.

== See also ==
- Desert island
- List of islands
