= Tuvalu Maritime Training Institute =

Coordinates: 8°26′17.6″S 179°10′16.3″E

Tuvalu Marine Training Institute
- Type: public
- Established: 1978
- Chief executive officer: Iefata Paeniu
- Faculty: 12
- Students: 120 graduates in 2009 and 2010
- Location: Tuvalu
- Campus: Amatuku

The Tuvalu Maritime Training Institute (TMTI) is on Amatuku motu, on Funafuti atoll in Tuvalu. TMTI provides training to approximately 120 marine cadets each year, to provide them with the basic skills necessary for employment as seafarers on merchant shipping. TMTI operates under the Tuvalu Maritime Training Institute Act 2000.

== Employment ==
A number of Tuvaluans are employed as merchant seamen on cargo ships on contracts of up to 12 months. The Asian Development Bank (ADB) estimated that, as of 2011, there were 800 Tuvaluan men trained, certified and active as seafarers. The ADB estimated that, at any one time, about 15 percent of the adult male population works abroad as seafarers.

The Ahrenkiel Group of Germany is the shipping company that is the primary employer of Tuvaluan seafarers. The SWIRE shipping company also employs Tuvaluan seafarers.

Twelve Tuvaluan sailors were among the crew of 24 of MV Hansa Stavanger, a German container ship that was captured by Somali pirates in April 2009.

== History ==
In the late 1960s and early 1970s merchant shipping evolved from an industry that involved ship registration and the recruitment of crew in the country of ownership to a multinational industry characterised by ‘internationalising’ crews, management and ship nationality using flags of convenience. Following the separation of Tuvalu from the Gilbert Islands, Tuvaluans could no more attend to Marine Training Centre in Tarawa. TMTI was so founded, just after independence from Kiribati, in 1978–79 to provide a training school for Tuvaluan men who are interested to be working as seaman, cooks or marine engineers in the international maritime industry with a basic level of maritime qualifications and to provide experienced seaman with revalidation and advanced training to upgrade their skills. The marine school on Amatuku motu (islet) opened in 1981.

== Development of the training facilities ==
Tuvalu has implemented the 2010 amendments to the Convention on Standards of Training Certification and Watchkeeping for Seafarers 1978 (STCWS), which improve training for managing security standards on merchant shipping to address risks such as piracy.

In 2002, the Asian Development Bank (ADB) approved an assistance package to upgrade the Tuvalu Maritime Training Institute. The redevelopment of TMTI was considered necessary to meet the competition provided by the growing supply of qualified seafarers graduating from an increasing number of maritime schools around the world and to meet the tightening of accreditation standards of the International Maritime Organization (IMO). The project financed by the ADB involved a jetty extension and installation of specialized safety-at-sea training equipment, installation of a fire fighting facility, expansion of the water catchment and storage capacity, construction of new staff housing, the rehabilitation and extension of trainee quarters and training facilities.

This redevelopment of TMTI involved a major replanning of the facilities on Amatuku motu including relocating the fire fighting simulator, the electricity power plant, residential block for the students and building a new double story school block. The workshop complex was renovated and now includes welding booths. A new jetty was built, which incorporates the lifeboat launching davits. The work was completed in 2011.

== Opportunities provided by TMTI training ==
The TMTI provides Tuvaluan men with eight months of training to provide the basic level of maritime qualifications necessary for employment in the international maritime industry. The 1991 census identified 272 seaman working on merchant shipping. In 2002, the Tuvalu Overseas Seamen's Union (TOSU) estimated the number as 417 seaman working on shipping. Remittances from seafarers is a major source of income for Tuvaluan families and are estimated to be AUD$4 million each year. However, the 2008 financial crisis impacted export/import activities with a resulting drop in job opportunities for Tuvaluan seaman merchant shipping. The ADB identify that the number of Tuvaluans employed as seafarers has decreased steadily from about 340 in 2001 to only 205 in 2010; so that of a total pool of 800 qualified seafarers, including those on leave, almost 450 were unemployed. This decline in seafarer employment has reduced remittances from $2.4 million in 2001 to a projected $1.2 million in 2010. The International Labour Organization (ILO) also estimates that in 2010 there were approximately 200 Tuvaluan seafarers on ships.

In July 2014, following a joint study by the Tuvalu Overseas Seamen's Union, the Tuvalu Maritime Services, the crewing agency APNL and the Tuvalu government, the government introduced a policy of reimburse 50% of the airfare between Tuvalu and Fiji. The study concluded that shipping companies were finding that recruiting Tuvaluan seafarers was too expensive and involved delays. The government also negotiated an extra flight a week with Fiji Link so that Tuvaluan seafarers could take up jobs on short notice.

== Demand for the services of Tuvaluan seafarers ==
The International Monetary Fund 2014 Country Report described the effect of the 2008 financial crisis as reducing demand for the services of Tuvaluan seafarers. As of October 2013, there were about 112 Tuvalu seafarers working on cargo boats, compared to 361 in 2006. The consequence is that remittances from seafarers to their families in Tuvalu fell by about 9 percent of GDP for Tuvalu. In 2012 remittances from seafarers amounted to 10 percent of GDP in Tuvalu.

Tuvaluan seafarers compete with those from Kiribati and South and Southeast Asian countries. There are higher transport costs for Tuvaluan and I-Kiribati seafarers to travel to take up positions of ships put them as a disadvantage as compared to other seafarers. Structural changes to merchant shipping industry have occurred after the 2008 financial crisis with the industry suffering low profitability and overcapacity. The increasing automation of ship operations has also reduced the demand for Tuvaluan seafarers. The training provided by the TMTI is generally for traditional merchant vessels so that Tuvaluan seafarers need to acquire the experience in technologies used on modern container ships while working on these ships.
