= Funafuti =

Capital of Tuvalu, atoll and district

- Atoll
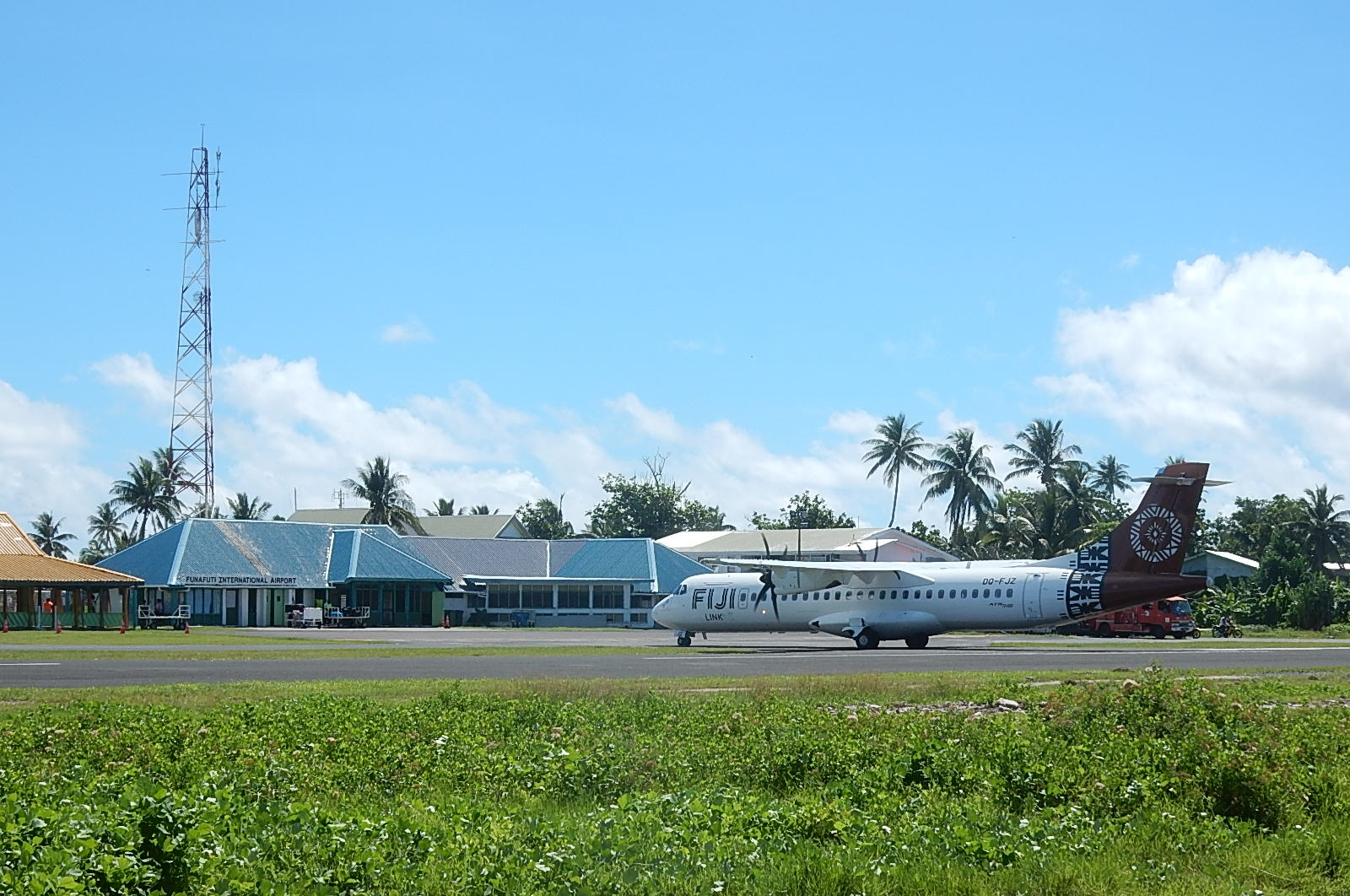
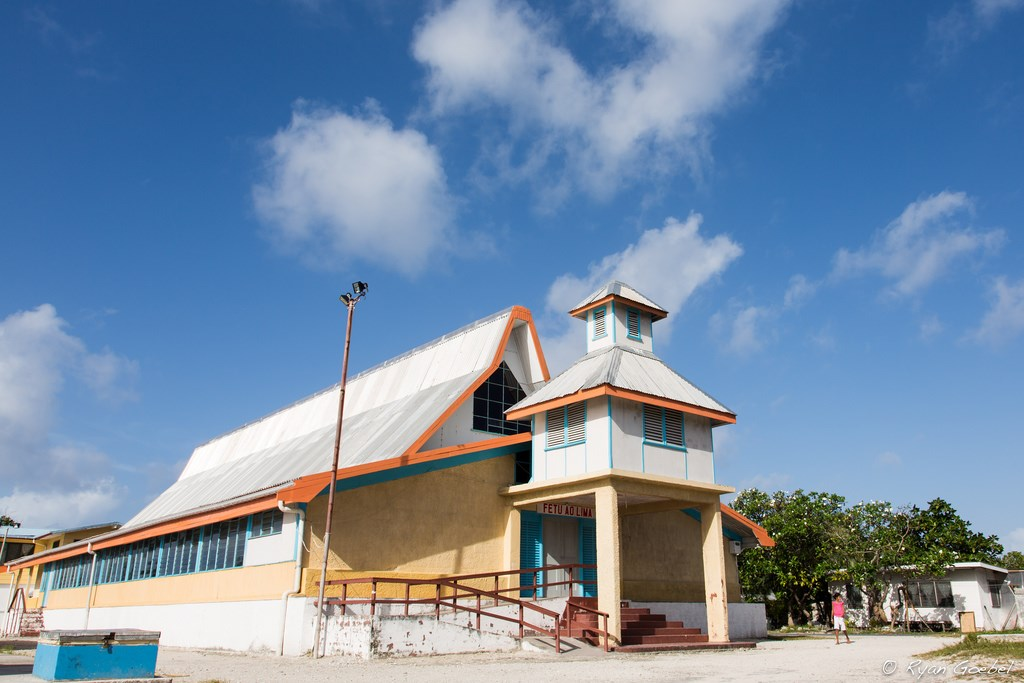
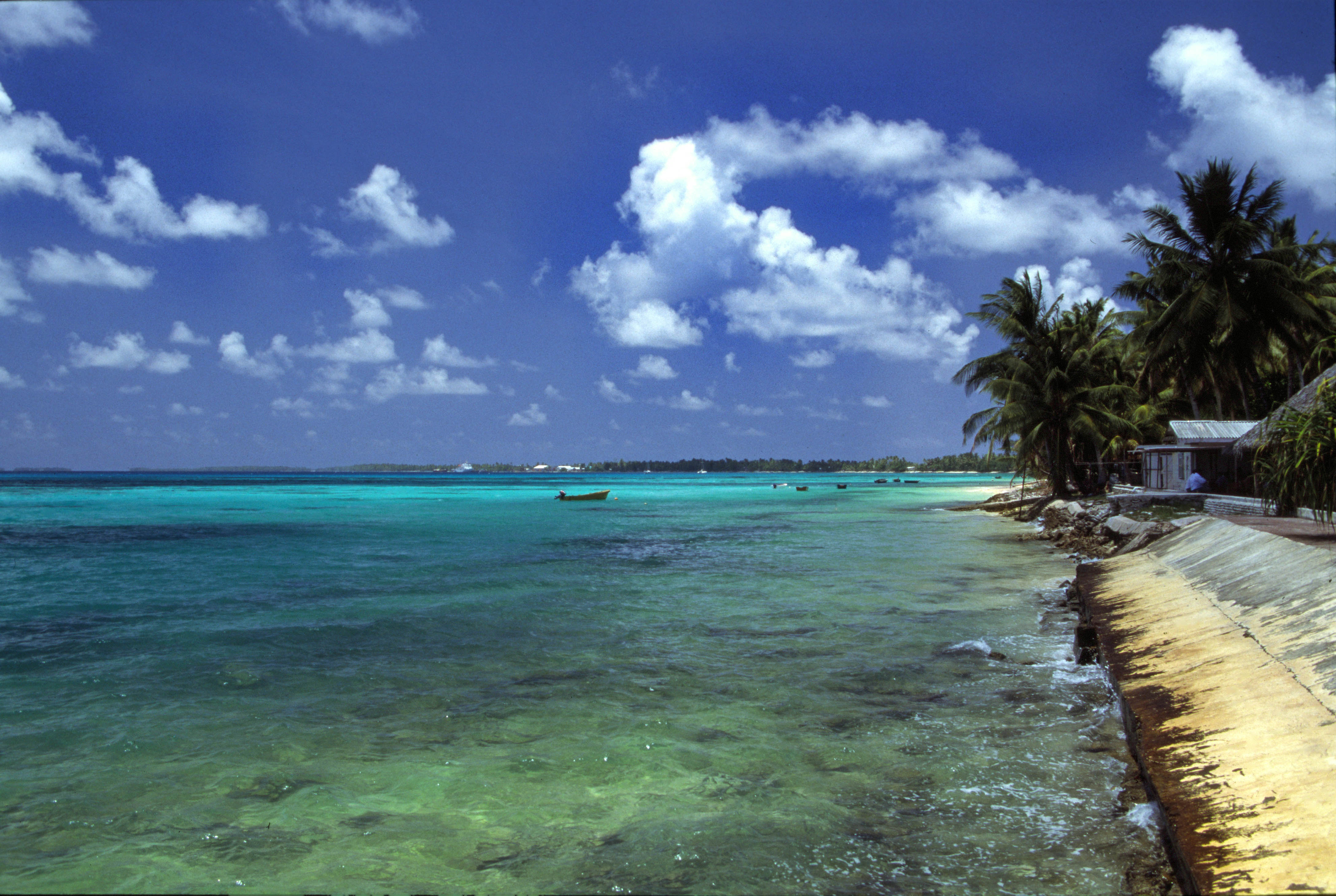
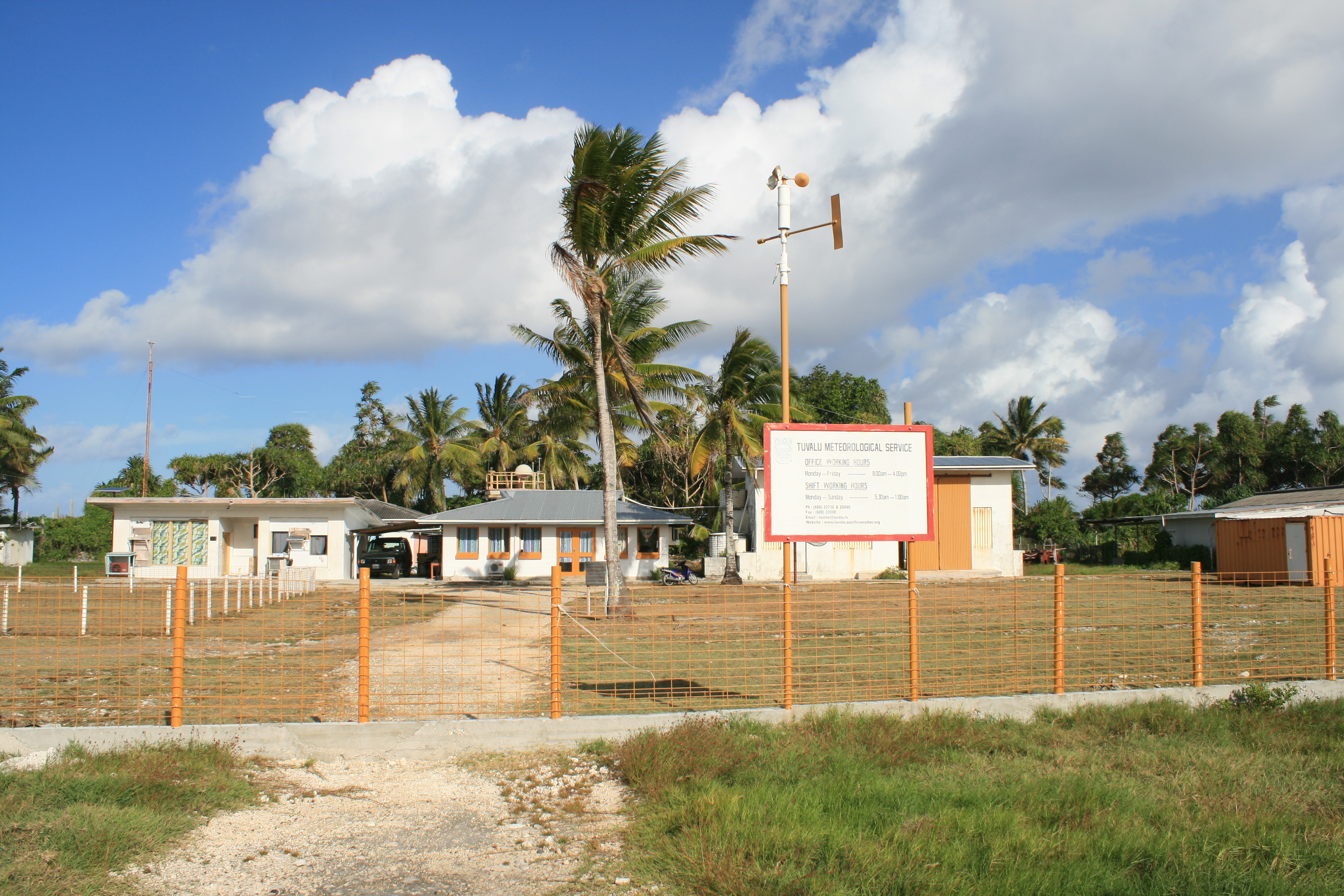
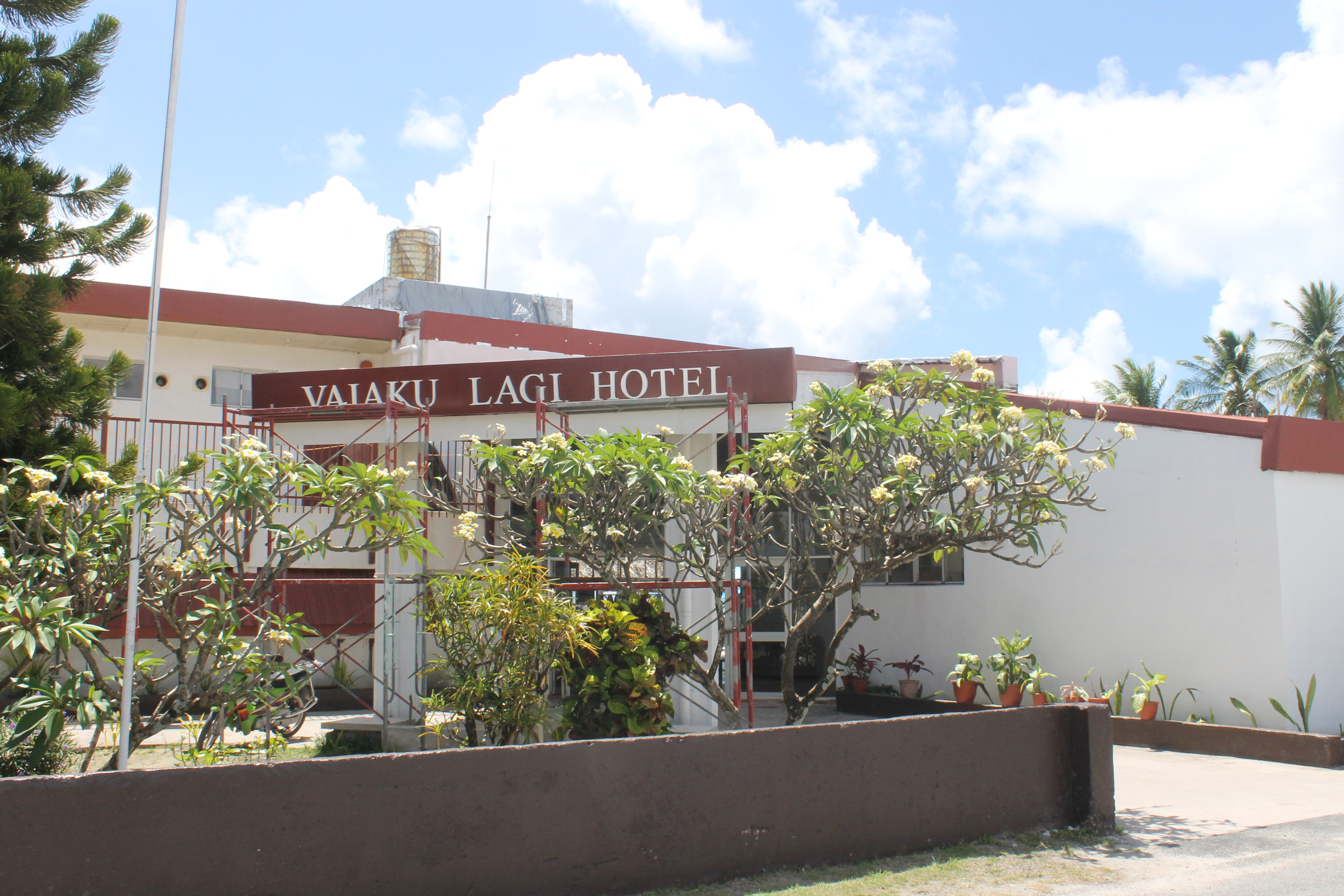
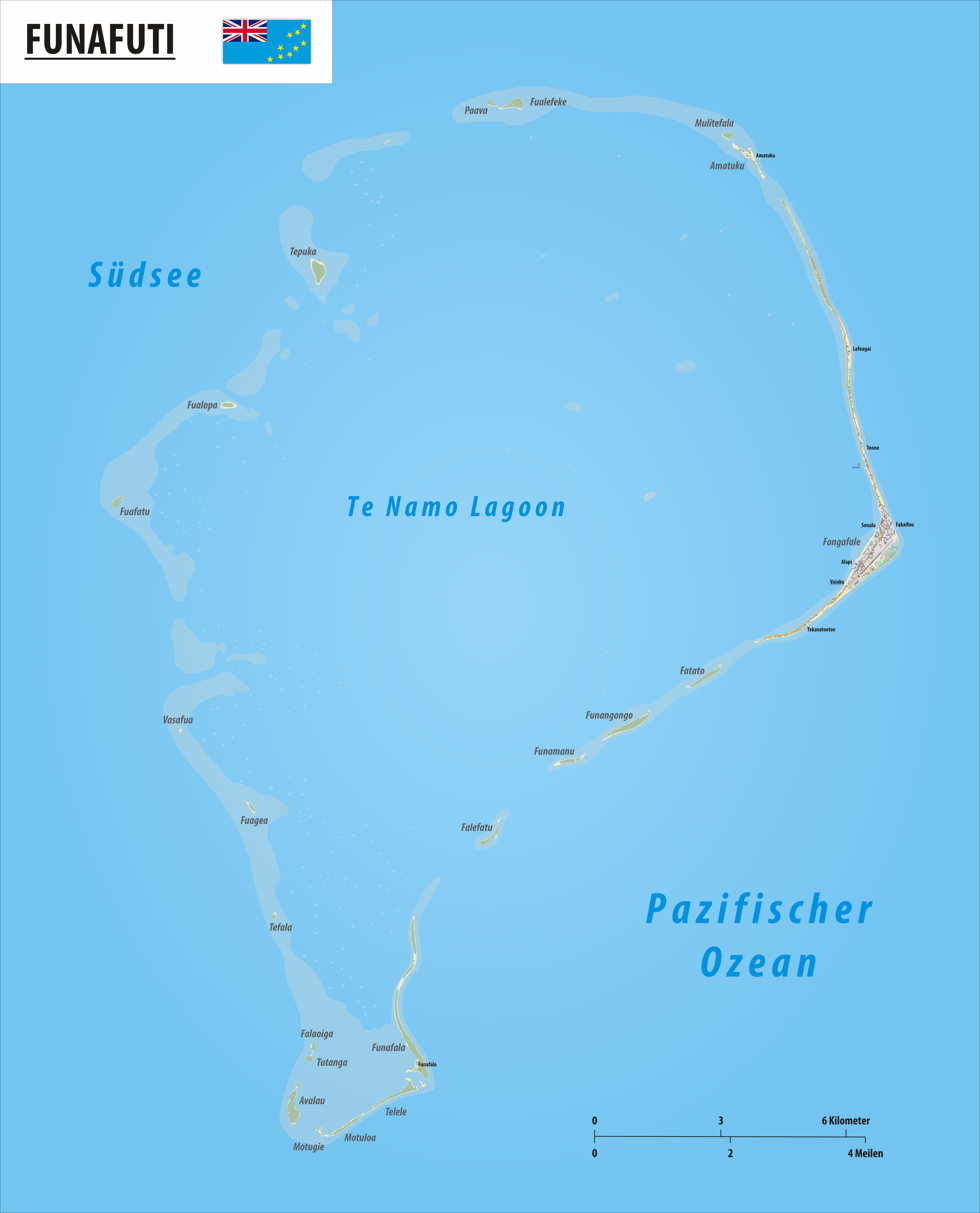
- International Airport Fetu Ao Lima Funafuti coastline Tuvalu Meteorological Service Funafuti Lagoon Hotel

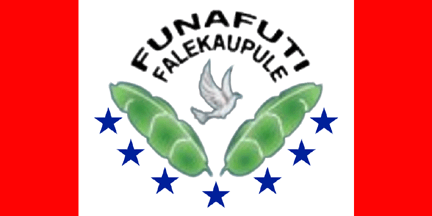
- Flag

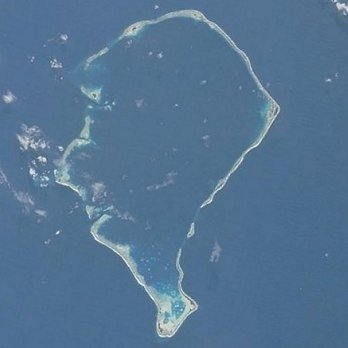
- Satellite image of Funafuti atoll

- Location of Funafuti atoll in Tuvalu
- Coordinates: 08°31′S 179°12′E
- Country: Tuvalu

Government
  - Parliament representatives: Tuafafa Latasi, Simon Kofe

Area
  - Total: 2.79 km^{2} (1.08 sq mi)

Population (2022)
  - Total: 6,602
  - Density: 2,370/km^{2} (6,130/sq mi)
- ISO 3166 code: TV-FUN
- Website: kaupulefunafuti.tv

Funafuti is an atoll, comprising numerous islets, that is the capital of Tuvalu. As of the 2017 census, it has a population of 6,320 people. More people live in Funafuti than the rest of Tuvalu combined, with it containing approximately 60% of the nation's population. It is the world's easternmost capital of a sovereign state. The main islet, Fongafale, hosts Vaiaku, the administrative centre of the nation.

Funafuti was first sighted by Europeans in 1819 by Arent Schuyler de Peyster, an American sea captain, who named it Ellice's Island. Between 1850 and 1875. In 1892, each of the Ellice Islands was declared a British protectorate by Captain Herbert Gibson of HMS Curacoa. In 1909, the first resident magistrate was appointed to Funafuti; in 1915, Funafuti, along with the rest of the Ellice Islands, were incorporated into the Gilbert and Ellice Islands as a crown colony. In October 1942, during World War II, Funafuti was occupied by American forces to serve as a strategic staging ground for the Gilbert and Marshall Islands campaign. Over the course of the war, the Americans dredged Funafuti's lagoon harbour and established the atoll's airfield, now known as Funafuti International Airport. In October 1972, Cyclone Bebe struck Funafuti, causing extensive damage; despite this Funafuti was chosen as the administrative capital of the newly founded nation of Tuvalu in 1978. As the capital of Tuvalu, Funafuti is by far the most urbanised atoll in the country, and is the hub of governmental, administrative, and economic activities.

The atoll consists of a narrow sweep of land between 20 and 400 metres (66 and 1,312 feet) wide, encircling a large lagoon (Te Namo) 18 km (11 miles) long and 14 km (9 miles) wide. The average depth of the Funafuti lagoon is about 20 fathoms (120 ft; 37 m). With a surface area of 275 square kilometres (106.2 sq mi), it is by far the largest lagoon in Tuvalu. The land area of the 33 islets around the atoll of Funafuti totals 2.4 square kilometres (0.9 sq mi); taken together, they constitute less than one percent of the total area of the atoll.

Much of Funafuti is less than one metre above sea level, making it highly susceptible to flooding. Projections indicate that by 2050, around half of the land area of Funafuti could be submerged during high tides as a result of rising sea levels, and by 2100, as much as 95% of the land may be flooded regularly.

The capital of Tuvalu is sometimes said to be Fongafale or Vaiaku, but, officially, the entire atoll of Funafuti is its capital, since it has a single government that is responsible for the whole atoll.

== History ==
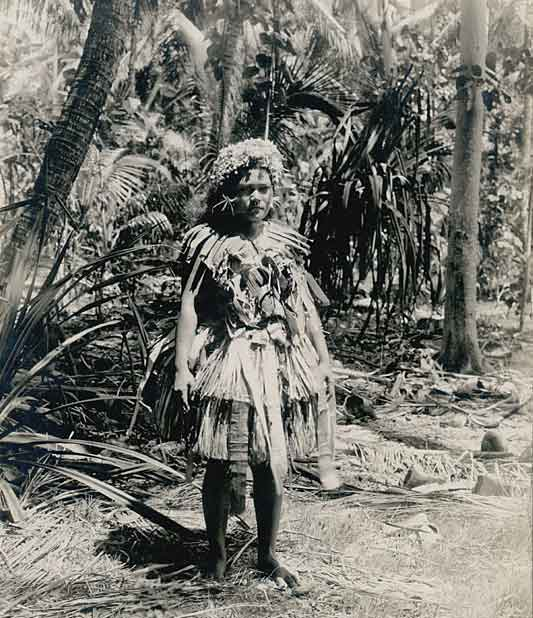
Woman on Funafuti; photo by Harry Clifford Fassett (1900), American photographer

The oral history of Funafuti maintains that its founding ancestor came from the Samoan Islands. The name Funafati is derived from the word "Funa", which means "chief" in Samoan. Furthermore, the name of one of the islets, Funafala, means "the pandanus of Funa."

Arent Schuyler de Peyster, captain of the armed brigantine privateer vessel Rebecca, was one of the first recorded non-Polynesian visitors to Funafuti. His vessel sailed under British colours, and in May 1819, de Peyster passed through the southern waters of Tuvalu and sighted Funafuti. He named it Ellice Island, after Edward Ellice, an English politician and member of parliament for Coventry.

In 1841, the United States Exploring Expedition, led by Charles Wilkes, visited Funafuti. The United States claimed Funafuti, along with based on the 1856 Guano Islands Act, and maintained this claim until 1983, when a treaty of friendship, concluded in 1979, went into effect.

In the 1850s, John (Jack) O'Brien became the first European to settle in Tuvalu. He became a trader on Funafuti and married Salai, the daughter of Funafuti's paramount chief; with his family name continuing on Funafuti. Alfred Restieaux, a native of England, lived and worked as a trader on Funafuti from July 1881 until about 1888 or 1889.

In 1882, members of the US Fish Commission visited Funafuti on the USFC Albatross to investigate the formation of coral reefs on Pacific atolls. During that visit, Harry Clifford Fassett, the captain's clerk and a photographer, took pictures of people, communities, and scenery in Funafuti.

George Westbrook, a trader based in Funafuti, recorded a tropical cyclone that struck Funafuti on 23–24 December 1883. At the time the cyclone struck, he was the lone inhabitant of Fongafale, Funafuti's largest islet, because Tema, a Samoan missionary, had taken everyone else to Funafala to work on erecting a church. The cyclone destroyed the buildings in Fongafale, including the church and the trading stores belonging to George Westbrook and Alfred Restieaux. Despite this, rebuilding work instantly began at Fongafale.

In 1892, Captain Edward Davis of HMS Royalist provided a report describing the traders and trading activities he observed on each of the islands he visited. Davis identified Jack O'Brien as a trader on Funafuti, and O’Brien was also reported to be living on the atoll in 1896.

In 1894 Count Rudolph Festetics de Tolna, his wife Eila (née Haggin), and her daughter Blanche Haggin visited Funafuti aboard the yacht Le Tolna. The Count spent several days photographing the men and woman of Funafuti.

The population of Funafuti during the years 1860 to 1900 is estimated to have been between 280 and 300 people. The Funafuti Post Office opened around 1911.

During the Pacific War (World War II) the Ellice Islands were used as a base to prepare for the subsequent seaborne attacks on the Gilbert Islands (Kiribati) that were occupied by Japanese forces. The United States Marine Corps 5th Defense Battalion landed on Funafuti on 2 October 1942; the operation was kept secret until the Japanese discovered it for themselves on 27 March 1943. On Funafuti, the islanders were shifted to the smaller islets to allow the American forces to build an airfield (now Funafuti International Airport), along with a 76-bed hospital and the Naval Base Funafuti port facilities on Fongafale islet.

In 1972, Funafuti lay in the path of Cyclone Bebe during the 1972–73 South Pacific cyclone season. Bebe was a pre-season tropical cyclone that hit the Gilbert, Ellice, and Fiji island groups. The cyclone system was first spotted on 20 October. It intensified and grew in size through 22 October. At about 4 p.m. on Saturday the 21st, sea water bubbled through the coral on the airfield and rose to a height of about 5 feet (1.5 m). Cyclone Bebe continued to ravage the area through Sunday 22 October. The Ellice Islands Colony's ship Moanaraoi, which was in the lagoon, survived. However, three tuna boats were wrecked. As waves broke over the atoll, five people died: two adults and a 3-month-old child were swept away by waves, and two sailors who had been in the wrecked tuna boats drowned. The cyclone knocked down 90% of the island's houses and trees. The storm surge created a wall of coral rubble along the ocean side of Fongafale and Funafala that was about 10 miles (16 km) long, and about 10 to 20 feet (3.0 to 6.1 m) thick at the bottom. The storm surge also destroyed or contaminated the area's sources of fresh drinking water.

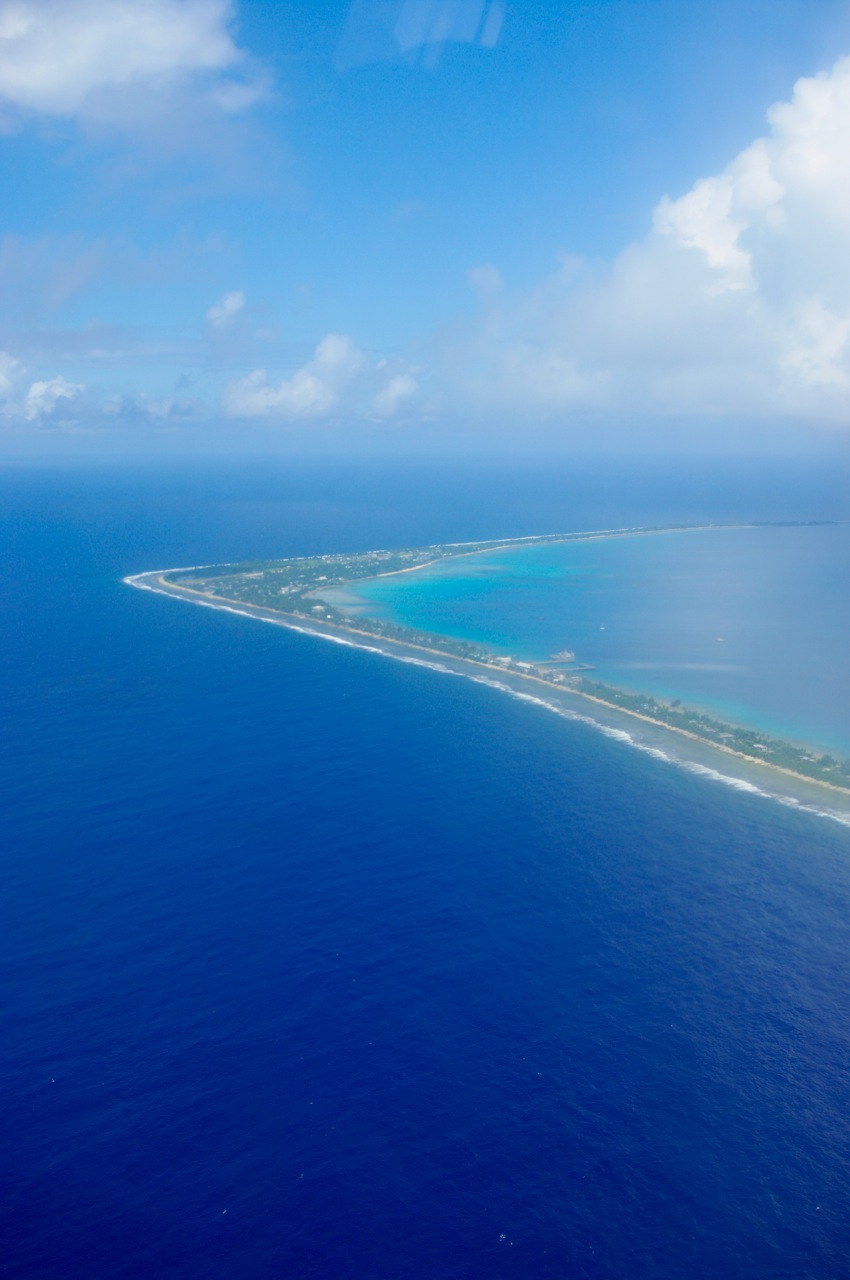
Aerial view of Tengako peninsula and Fongafale, Funafuti atoll, looking south

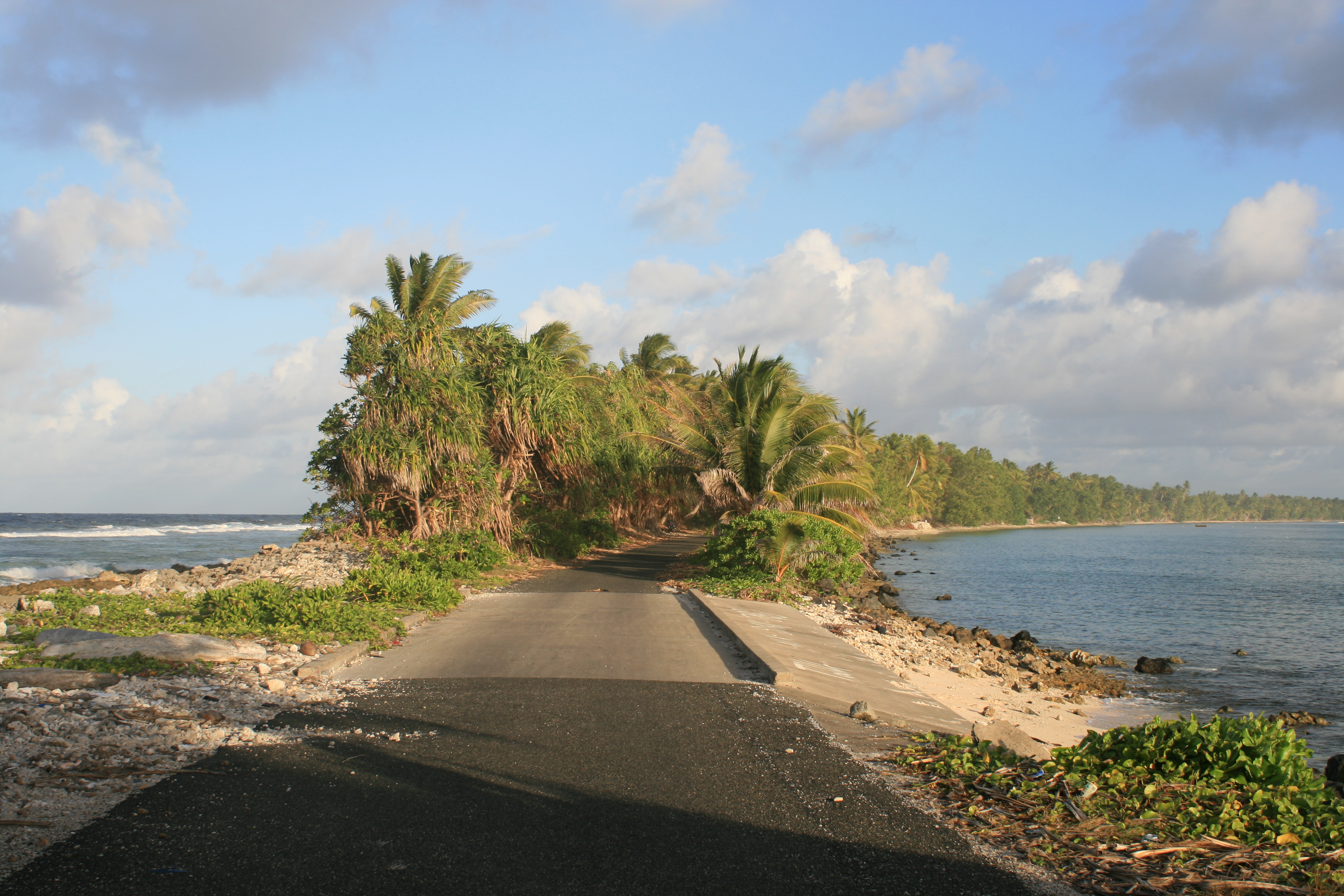
Tengako peninsula, Funafuti atoll, looking south

In June 1996, the Funafuti Conservation Area was established along the western rim of the reef, encompassing six islets. It has an area of 33 square kilometres (13 sq mi), containing 20 per cent of the reef area of Funafuti. The land area of the six islets in the conservation area is 8 ha (20 acres). Below is a list of the islets in the conservation area, in order from north to south, with their estimated areas in hectares:

- Tepuka Vilivili, 3
- Fualopa, 2
- Fuafatu, 0.2
- Vasafua, 0.5
- Fuakea, 1.5
- Tefala, 1

=== 21st century ===
Funafuti stands as both a political and environmental symbol of the challenges faced by small island developing states (SIDS) in the modern era. Since the turn of the 21st century, Funafuti has been at the forefront of regional and international discourse surrounding climate change, sustainable development, and geopolitical cooperation. This period in its history is shaped by mounting environmental pressures, efforts at socio-political resilience, and increasingly vital international partnerships.

=== Darwin's Drill ===
The Darwin's Drill project, conducted by the Royal Society of London in 1896, 1897, and 1898, involved drilling boreholes on Funafuti to test Charles Darwin's theory of coral atoll formation. The expeditions sought evidence of shallow-water organisms deep within the coral structure. Professor Sollas led the 1896 expedition and later published a report on the atoll study. Professor Edgeworth David of the University of Sydney participated in the 1896 expedition and led the 1897 effort. Photographers on the expeditions recorded people, communities and scenes at Funafuti.

The geological significance of Funafuti in testing Darwin's theory was recognised in October 2022, when the International Union of Geological Sciences (IUGS) included the atoll in its list of 100 'geological heritage sites' worldwide.

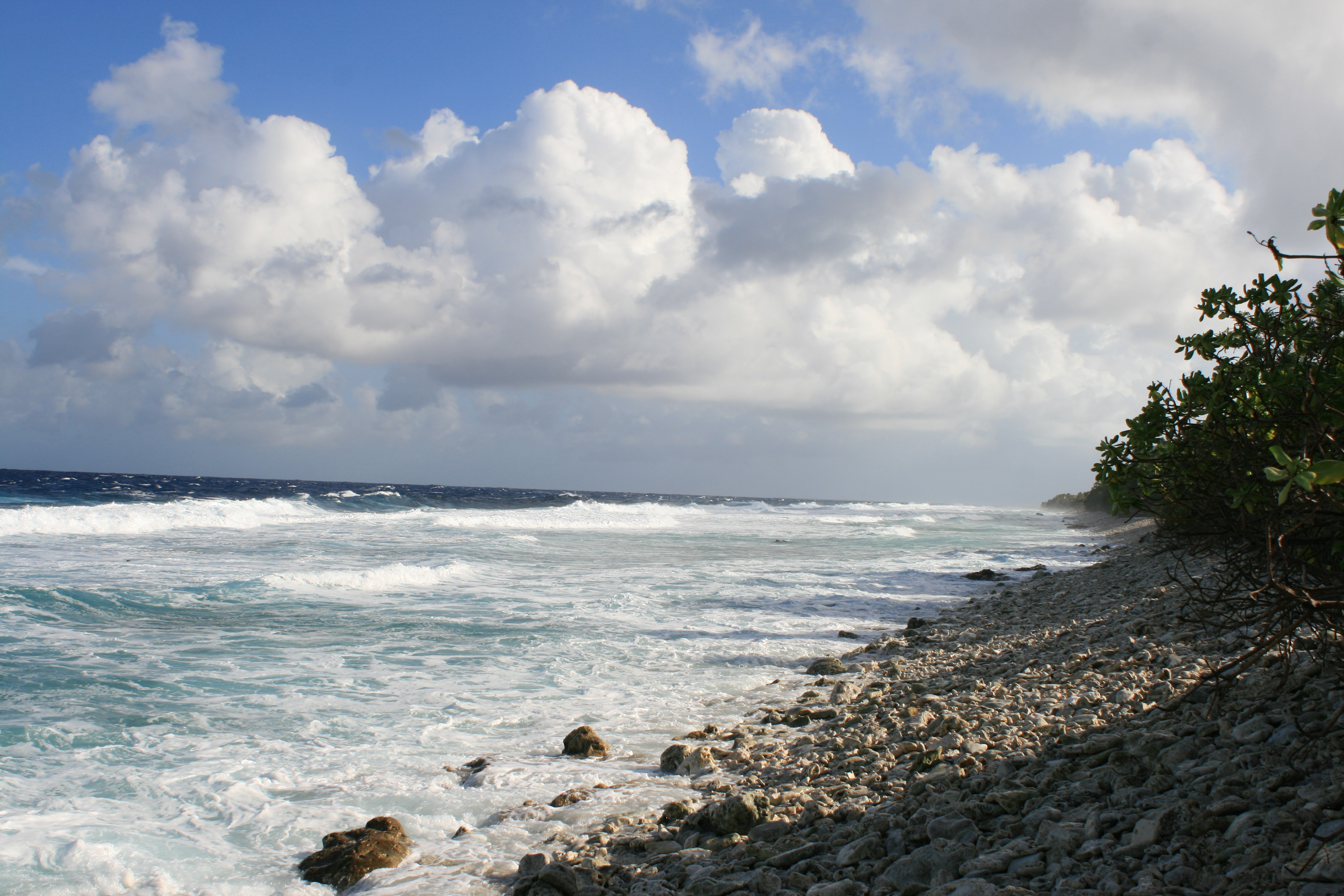
Ocean side of Funafuti atoll showing the storm dunes, the highest point on the atoll.

Funafuti, the capital atoll of Tuvalu, has become a focal point for global discussions on climate change and its impacts on low-lying island nations. With an average elevation of just two metres above sea level, Funafuti faces existential threats from rising sea levels, making it a critical site for understanding the intersection of environmental vulnerability, adaptation efforts, and international cooperation.

Tuvalu's vulnerability is underscored by projections indicating that by 2050, half of Funafuti could be submerged during high tides, with up to 95% potentially flooded by 2100. This situation has led to significant environmental challenges, including the contamination of freshwater sources and the degradation of agricultural land. In response, the government has initiated several adaptation projects, notably the Tuvalu Coastal Adaptation Project (TCAP), which aims to protect vulnerable shorelines and reclaim land to mitigate the effects of sea-level rise.

== Geography ==
=== Islands ===
There are at least 29 islets in the Funafuti atoll. The largest is Fongafale, followed by Funafala. At least three of these islets are inhabited: Fongafale (the main island) in the east, Funafala in the south, and Amatuku in the north.

- Amatuku
- Avalau
- Falaoigo
- Fale Fatu (or Falefatu)
- Fatato
- Fongafale
- Fuafatu
- Fuagea
- Fualefeke (or Fualifeke)
- Fualopa
- Funafala
- Funamanu
- Luamotu
- Mateika
- Motugie
- Motuloa
- Mulitefala
- Papa Elise (or Funangongo)
- Te Afuafou
- Te Afualiku
- Tefala
- Telele
- Tengako (peninsula of the island of Fongafale)
- Tengasu
- Tepuka
- Tepuka Vili Vili
- Tutanga
- Vasafua

=== Villages ===
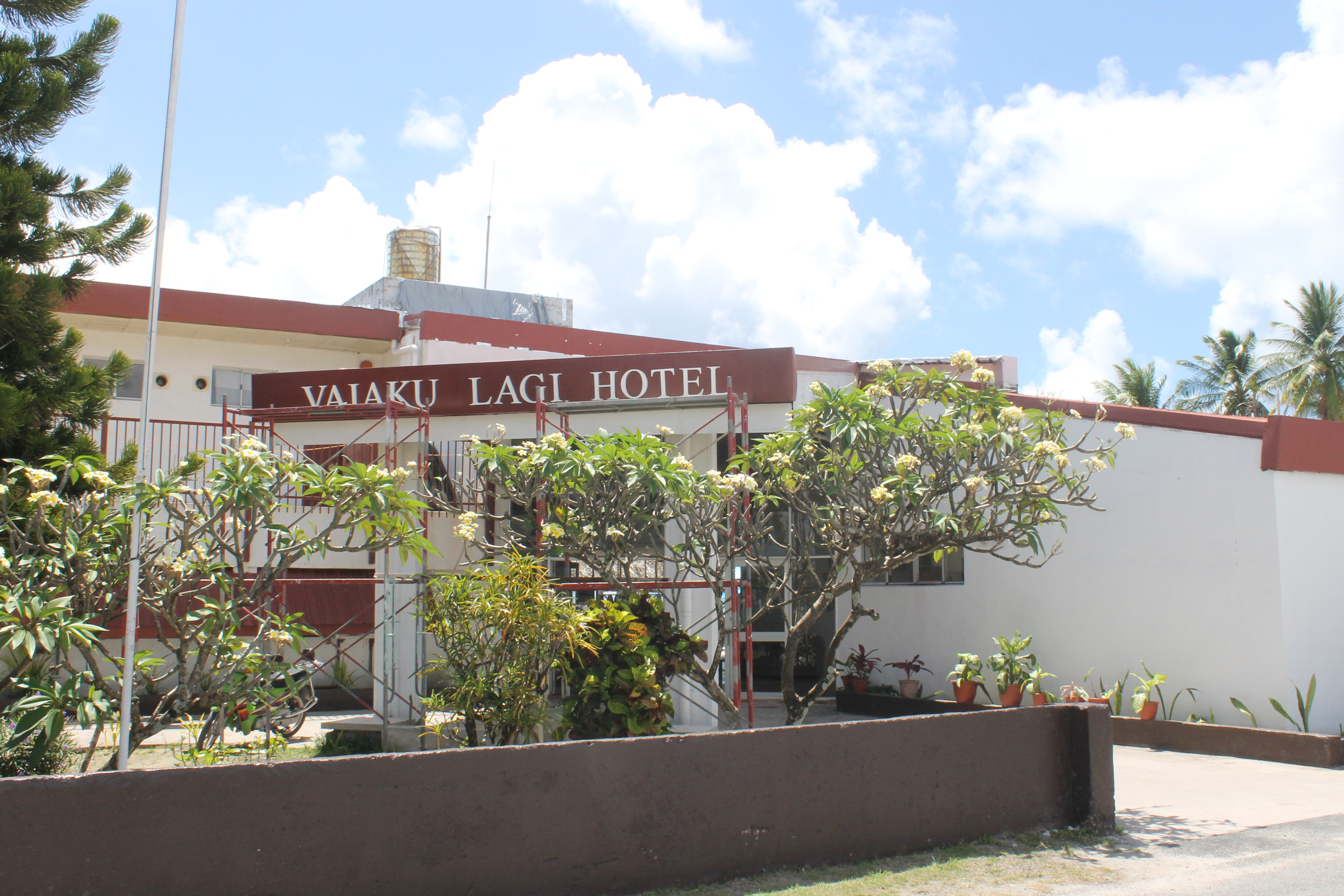
Funafuti Lagoon Hotel

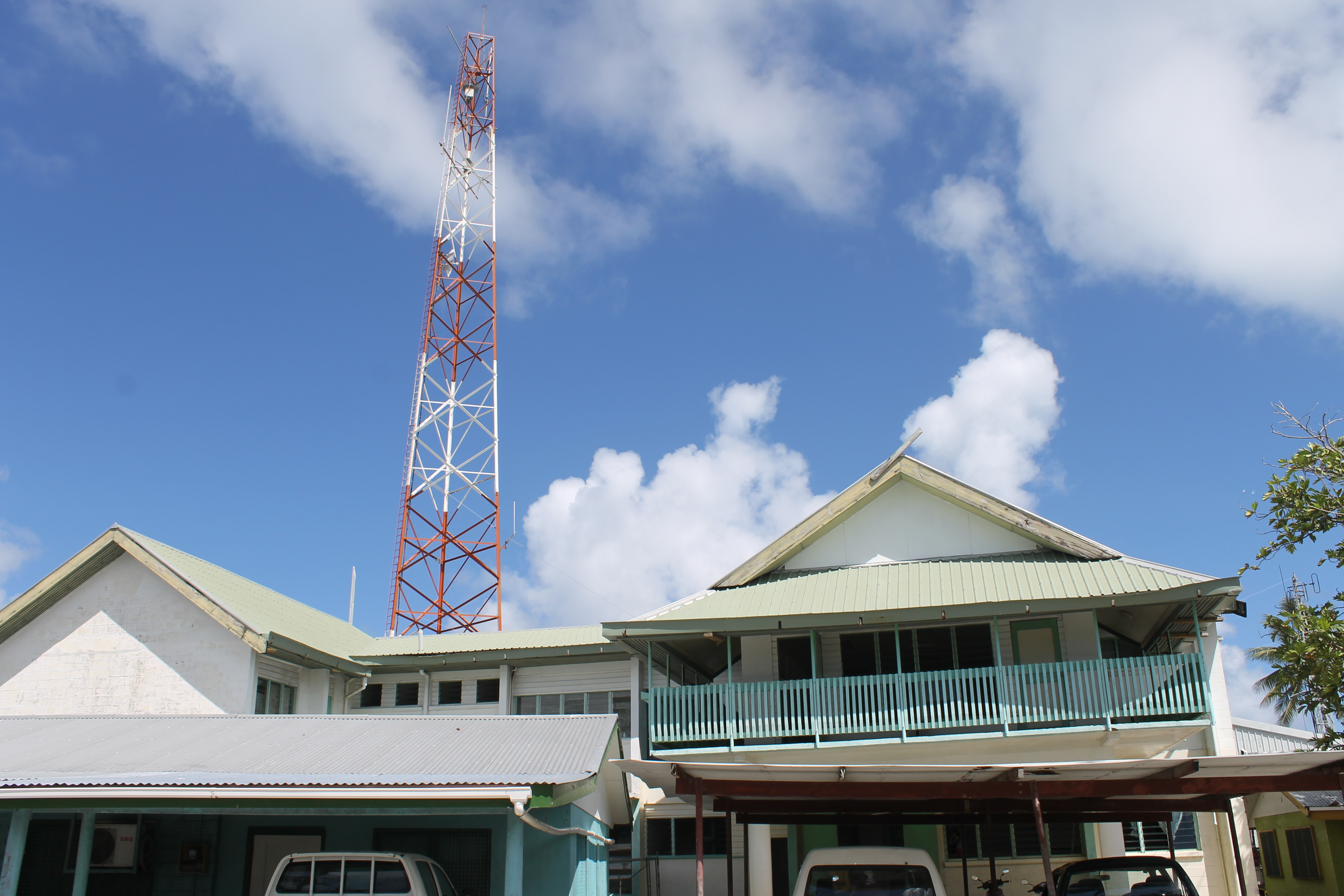
Offices of the Tuvalu Telecommunications Corporation

The district of Funafuti comprises nine villages on six islets, with four of the villages located on Fongafale. Many islands only contain one village. Their populations as of the 2012 census are listed below:

Name		Population
Islet	Village	Population
Amatuku		128
Fongafale	Alapi	1,029
Fongafale	Fakaifou	1,158
Fongafale	Senala	1,207
Fongafale	Vaiaku	638
Fongafale	Lofeagai	627
Fongafale	Tekavatoetoe	650
Fongafale	Teone	570
Funafala		50

=== Lagoon ===
The Funafuti atoll's lagoon (Te Namo in Tuvaluan) is 24.5 km (15 1/4 miles) long, north to south, and 17.5 km (10 3/4 miles) wide, east to west, and has an area of 275 km^{2} (106 sq. mi.), making it by far the largest lagoon in the nation of Tuvalu. It is about 52 metres (28 fathoms) deep in some places, but only 6 metres (3 1/4 fathoms) deep in other places (because it has several submerged rocks and reefs along its bottom, some of which are close to the surface). The deepest basin is in the northern part of the lagoon (the maximum recorded depth is 54.7 metres (29.9 fathoms), while the southern part of the lagoon has a very narrow, shallow basin. The Funafuti Conservation Area is located 15 kilometres (9.3 mi) across the lagoon from the main island of Fongafale, and is accessed by boat.

== Landmarks ==
Tausoa Lima Falekaupule is the traditional meeting house on Funafuti. Tausoalima means "hand of friendship" and Falekaupule means "traditional island meeting hall." There is the Funafuti Lagoon Hotel, and other guesthouses as well as homes, constructed both in the traditional manner, out of palm fronds, and more recently out of cement blocks. The most prominent building on Funafuti atoll is the Fētu'ao Lima (Morning Star Church) of the Church of Tuvalu.

Other sites of interest are the remains of Japanese aircraft that crashed on Funafuti during World War II. The airfield was constructed during World War II by American troops for the Pacific Theatre. After the war, it was adapted to serve as the Funafuti International Airport, which serves both as the airstrip for the flights from Fiji as well as providing a place for sporting and other recreational activities.

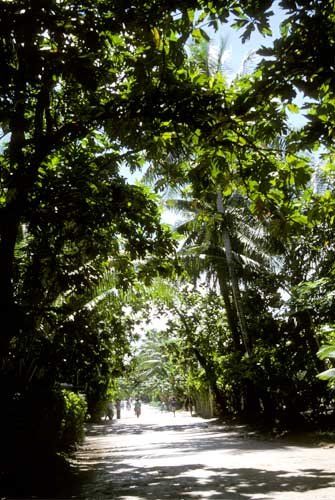
A street in Funafuti.

A major sporting event is the "Independence Day Sports Festival", held annually at Fongafale on 1 October. The most important sports event within the country is arguably the Tuvalu Games, which are held yearly since 2008, with teams coming to Funafuti from the outer islands to compete in the games. Football in Tuvalu is played at club and national team level. The Tuvalu national football team trains at the Tuvalu Sports Ground on Funafuti and competes in the Pacific Games and South Pacific Games.

The Parliament of Tuvalu or Palamene o Tuvalu is located on Fongafale, together with the offices of the government departments and the government agencies, including the Tuvalu Telecommunications Corporation, National Bank of Tuvalu, Tuvalu Philatelic Bureau, Tuvalu Meteorological Service, Tuvalu National Library and Archives and the Tuvalu Media Department that operates Radio Tuvalu. The police service has its headquarters and the jail on Fongafale. The High Court of Tuvalu is also located on Fongafale.

The Princess Margaret Hospital, the only hospital in Tuvalu, is located on Fongafale.

The installed PV capacity in Funafuti in 2020 was 735 kW compared to 1800 kW of diesel (16% penetration).

== Climate ==
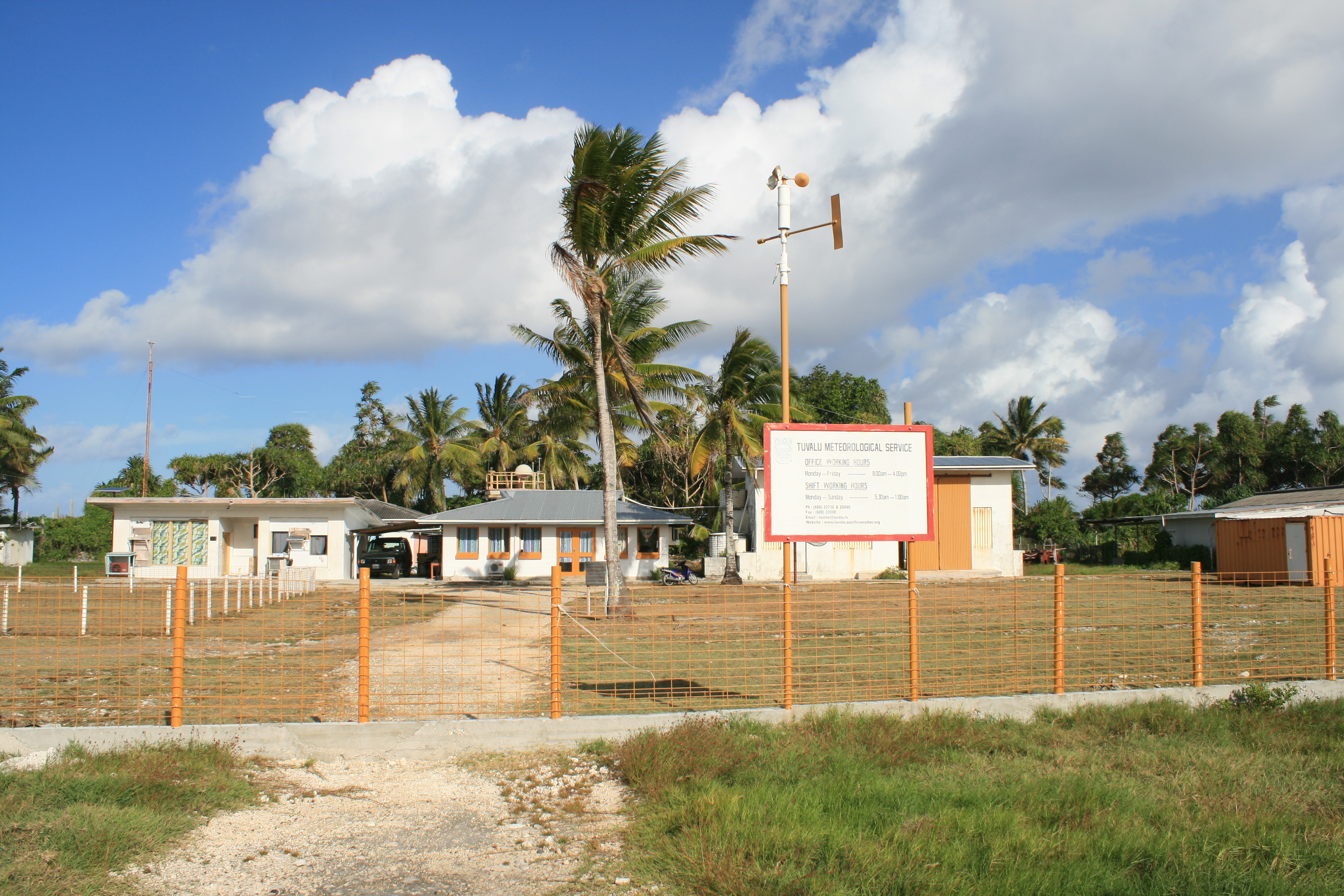
Tuvalu Meteorological Service station, Fongafale

Funafuti has a tropical rainforest climate (Köppen climate classification Af). Because it experiences frequent cyclones, it is not considered to have an equatorial climate. It sees an extraordinary amount of rainfall throughout the year and has no dry season: the town has no month in which less than 200 millimetres (7.9 in) rain falls, and an average of about 3,500 millimetres (140 in) of precipitation annually. As is common in many areas with a tropical rainforest climate, the temperature varies little during the year; average daily temperatures hover around 28 °C (82 °F) year-round. When comparing seasonal weathers, summer (December to February) is the wettest season, while winter (June to August) is the driest season. Autumn (March to May) is the “hottest” season, and summer is the “coldest” season. However, autumn averages are only 0.3 degrees Celsius hotter than summer averages.

Climate data for Funafuti International Airport (1991–2020 normals, extremes 1936–2020)
Month	Jan	Feb	Mar	Apr	May	Jun	Jul	Aug	Sep	Oct	Nov	Dec	Year
Record high °C (°F)	33.9 (93.0)	34.4 (93.9)	34.4 (93.9)	34.2 (93.6)	33.9 (93.0)	33.9 (93.0)	33.6 (92.5)	33.1 (91.6)	33.5 (92.3)	34.4 (93.9)	34.2 (93.6)	34.2 (93.6)	34.4 (93.9)
Mean daily maximum °C (°F)	31.1 (88.0)	31.2 (88.2)	31.3 (88.3)	31.6 (88.9)	31.6 (88.9)	31.4 (88.5)	31.1 (88.0)	31.1 (88.0)	31.4 (88.5)	31.6 (88.9)	31.7 (89.1)	31.6 (88.9)	31.4 (88.5)
Daily mean °C (°F)	28.5 (83.3)	28.4 (83.1)	28.6 (83.5)	28.9 (84.0)	28.9 (84.0)	28.8 (83.8)	28.6 (83.5)	28.5 (83.3)	28.7 (83.7)	28.8 (83.8)	28.9 (84.0)	28.7 (83.7)	28.7 (83.7)
Mean daily minimum °C (°F)	25.8 (78.4)	25.7 (78.3)	25.8 (78.4)	26.2 (79.2)	26.3 (79.3)	26.3 (79.3)	26.2 (79.2)	26.0 (78.8)	26.1 (79.0)	26.0 (78.8)	26.0 (78.8)	25.9 (78.6)	26.0 (78.8)
Record low °C (°F)	22.0 (71.6)	22.0 (71.6)	22.1 (71.8)	21.4 (70.5)	20.5 (68.9)	22.0 (71.6)	21.0 (69.8)	17.1 (62.8)	20.0 (68.0)	19.9 (67.8)	21.7 (71.1)	21.5 (70.7)	17.1 (62.8)
Average precipitation mm (inches)	413.8 (16.29)	351.2 (13.83)	354.3 (13.95)	274.9 (10.82)	241.4 (9.50)	215.0 (8.46)	242.9 (9.56)	254.0 (10.00)	206.5 (8.13)	253.6 (9.98)	256.4 (10.09)	332.6 (13.09)	3,396.5 (133.72)
Average precipitation days (≥ 1 mm)	19.2	18.5	19.3	17.3	17.4	17.0	18.1	18.3	16.2	16.1	16.2	18.9	212.5
Average relative humidity (%)	82	82	82	82	82	82	83	82	81	81	80	81	82
Mean monthly sunshine hours	179.8	161.0	186.0	201.0	195.3	201.0	195.3	220.1	210.0	232.5	189.0	176.7	2,347.7
Mean daily sunshine hours	5.8	5.7	6.0	6.7	6.3	6.7	6.3	7.1	7.0	7.5	6.3	5.7	6.4
Source 1: National Oceanic and Atmospheric Administration
Source 2: Deutscher Wetterdienst (humidity 1961–1990, sun 1978–1990)

== Transportation ==
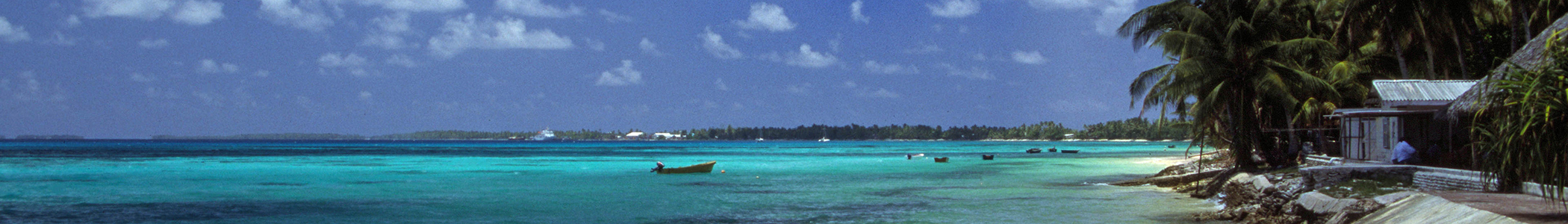
Funafuti beach (2013)

Funafuti International Airport (IATA: FUN, ICAO: NGFU) is located on Fongafale.

Fiji Airways, the owner of Fiji Airlines (trading as Fiji Link) operates air transport services three times per week (on Tuesday, Thursday and Saturday) between Suva and Funafuti. The flights originate in Nadi, and use ATR 72-600 aircraft, which can carry up to 68 passengers.

Fongafale has port facilities and two passenger/cargo ships, Nivaga III and Manu Folau, which make round trips between Fongafale and the outer islands about once every three or four weeks, and also travel between Suva, Fiji, and Funafuti about three or four times a year.

In 2015 the Japanese government donated the Nivaga III, to Tuvalu, to replace the Nivaga II, which had served Tuvalu since 1989.

== Politics ==
The Funafuti Falekaupule is the local council, with the Kaupule as the executive of the Falekaupule. On Fongafale, the Funafuti Kaupule is responsible for approvals of the construction of houses or extension to an existing buildings on private land and the Lands Management Committee is the responsible authority in relation to lands leased by Government.

Funafuti is one of the eight constituencies in Tuvalu, and elects two members of parliament. The 2024 general election in Tuvalu resulted in the re-election of Simon Kofe, the election of Tuafafa Latasi, and the defeat of incumbent Kausea Natano.

Funafuti constituency results
Party	Candidate	Votes	%
Nonpartisan	Tuafafa Latasi	351	31.08
Nonpartisan	Simon Kofe	348	30.82
Nonpartisan	Kausea Natano	331	29.32
Nonpartisan	Iosua Samasoni	53	4.70
Nonpartisan	Luke Paeniu	37	0.13
Nonpartisan	Jack Mataio Taleka	9	0.8

== Education ==
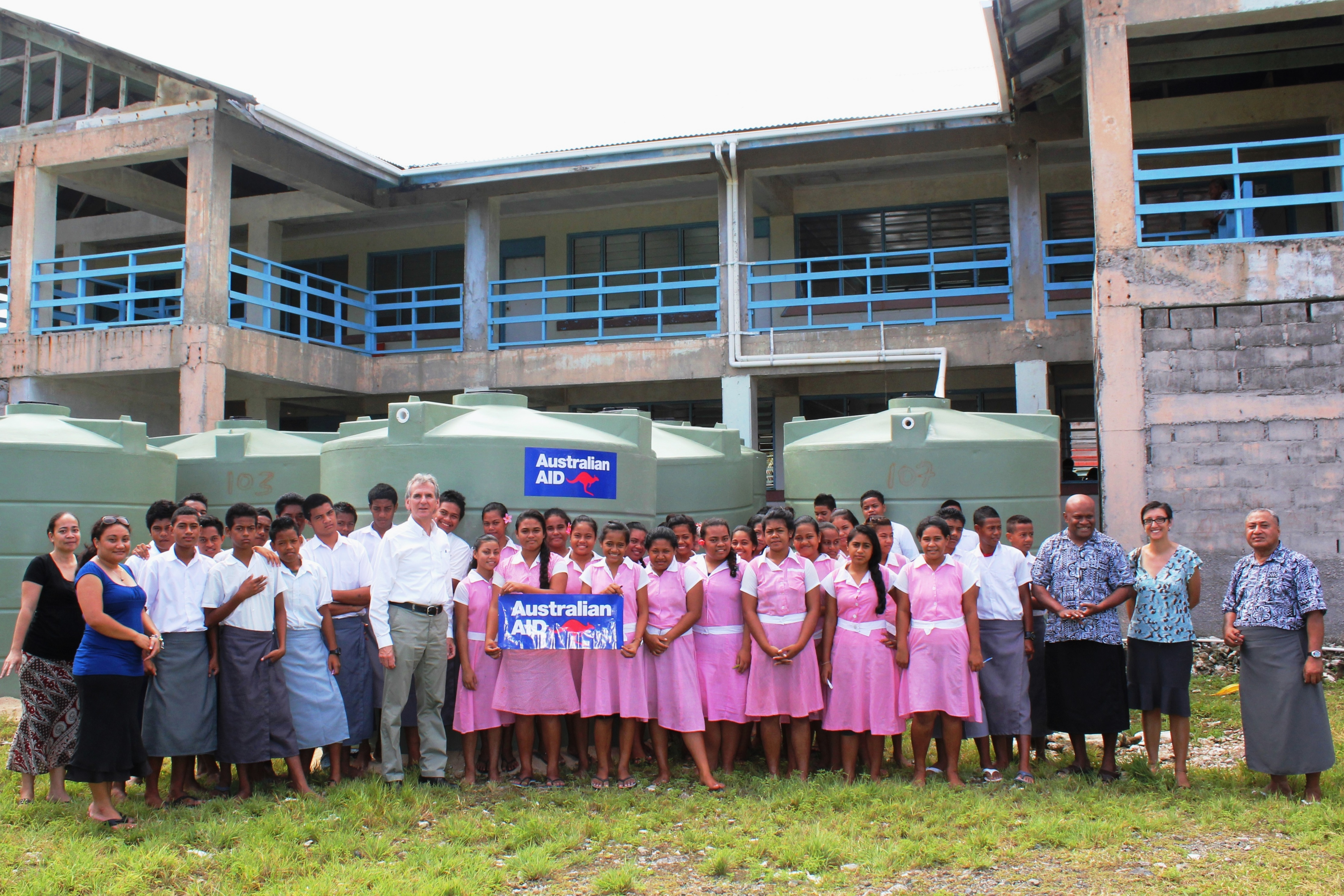
Water storage tanks installed at Fetuvalu High School

Four tertiary institutions on Funafuti offer technical and vocational courses: Tuvalu Maritime Training Institute (TMTI), Tuvalu Atoll Science Technology Training Institute (TASTII), Australian Pacific Training Coalition (APTC) and University of the South Pacific (USP) Extension Centre.

There are two junior schools, the Seventh Day Adventist Primary School and Nauti Primary School, which, combined, have a register of more than 900 pupils. This makes it the largest primary school in Tuvalu (with 45 per cent of the total primary school enrolment).

The Church of Tuvalu operates Fetuvalu Secondary School. The University of the South Pacific (USP) Extension Centre on Funafuti operates the Augmented Foundation Programme for sixth form students who pass their Pacific Secondary School Certificate (PSSC) so that students have the opportunity to enroll in tertiary education programmes outside of Tuvalu. The Tuvalu Maritime Training Institute (TMTI) is located on the islet of Amatuku.

== Notable people ==
- Sir Toaripi Lauti, GCMG PC (28 November 1928 – 25 May 2014): first Chief Minister of the Ellice Islands (from 2 October 1975 to 1 October 1978); first Prime Minister of Tuvalu (from 1 October 1978 to 8 September 1981); third Governor General of Tuvalu (from 1 October 1990 to 1 December 1993).
- Sir Kamuta Latasi, KCMG OBE PC MP (born 1936): fourth Prime Minister of Tuvalu (from 1993 to 1996); Speaker of the Parliament of Tuvalu (2006 to September 2010, and December 2010 to March 2014).
- Kausea Natano (born 5 July 1957) was the 13th Prime Minister of Tuvalu (from 19 September 2019 to 26 February 2024). He represented Funafuti as a Member of Parliament from the 2002 Tuvaluan general election until the 2024 Tuvaluan general election.

== See also ==
- Funafuti Conservation Area
- History of Tuvalu
- List of Guano Island claims
