= Funafuti Lagoon Hotel =

Hotel in Funafuti, Tuvalu

Coordinates: 8.52366°S 179.19479°E

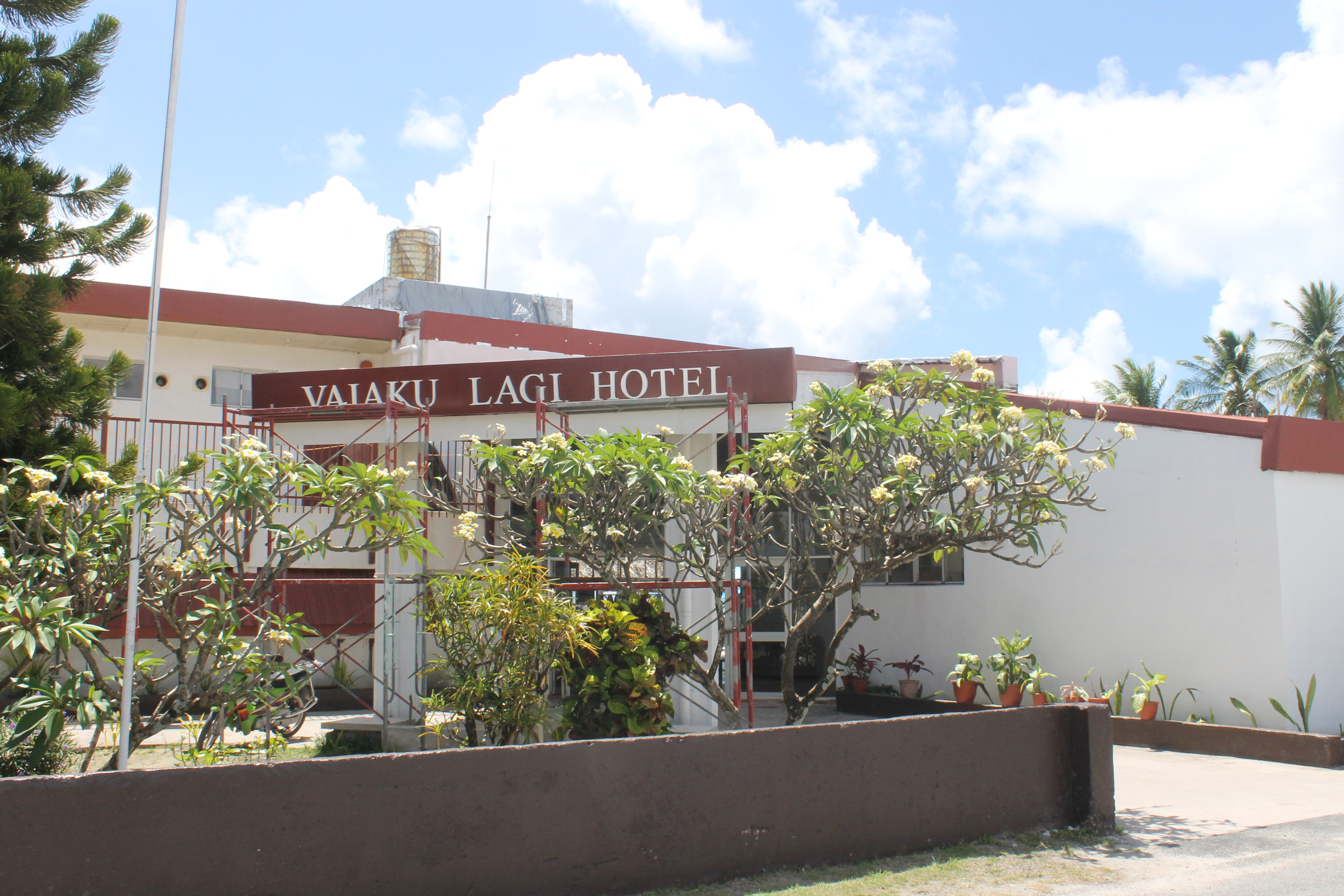
- Hotel in 2012, when it was known as Vaiaku Langi Hotel
- Interactive map of the Funafuti Lagoon Hotel area

General information
- Location: Funafuti, Tuvalu

Other information
- Number of rooms: 16

Funafuti Lagoon Hotel formally known as Vaiaku Langi Hotel, or Vaiaku Lagi Hotel, is situated in Funafuti, in the Pacific island nation of Tuvalu. The hotel was built in 1993 with financial assistance from the government of Taiwan.

== Features ==
The hotel is a government-owned establishment. There are 16 guest rooms in the new section, and additional rooms in the older complex. There is a bar, barbecue area and dance floor.

“Wednesday Night Buffet Dinner” is a featured event. The dinner is followed by Tuvaluan dancing.
