= Fongafale =

Islet of Funafuti in Tuvalu

- Island
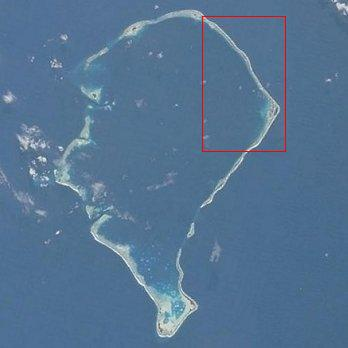
- Location of Fongafale island in the Funafuti atoll

- Location in Tuvalu
- Coordinates: 08°31′S 179°12′E
- Country: Tuvalu
- Atoll: Funafuti

Area
  - Total: 2 km^{2} (0.77 sq mi)

Population (2012)
  - Total: 6,006
  - Density: 3,000/km^{2} (7,800/sq mi)

Fongafale (also spelled Fogale or Fagafale) is the largest and most populated of Funafuti's islets in Tuvalu. It is a long narrow sliver of land, 12 km 7.46 miles long and between 10 and 400 metres (11 and 438 yd) wide, with the South Pacific Ocean and reef on the east and the protected lagoon on the west. The north part is the Tengako peninsula, and Funafuti International Airport runs from northeast to southwest on the widest part of the island, with the village and administrative centre of Vaiaku on the lagoon side.

On Fongafale, the Funafuti Kaupule is responsible for approval of the construction of houses or extensions to existing buildings on private land, and the Lands Management Committee is the responsible authority in relation to lands leased by government.

In 1972, Funafuti was in the path of Cyclone Bebe. Cyclone Bebe knocked down 90% of the houses and trees on Fongafale. The storm surge created a wall of coral rubble along the ocean side of Fongafale and Funafala that was about 10 miles (16 km) long, and about 10 feet (3.0 m) to 20 feet (6.1 m) thick at the bottom.

== Villages on Fongafale ==
Fogafale islet is the location of the main village settlements of Lofeagai, Teone, Fakai Fou, Senala, Alapi, Vaiaku and Kavatoetoe, from the northern to the southern point of the islet respectively which appear as one contiguous urban area.

Vaiaku is the most important neighbourhood; it includes Funafuti Lagoon Hotel, some shops, a fuel pump station, the general post office, and the National Bank of Tuvalu, the nation's only commercial bank. The villages have a surface area of more than 0.65 square kilometres and approximately 4,000 inhabitants.

== Parliament of Tuvalu and government buildings ==
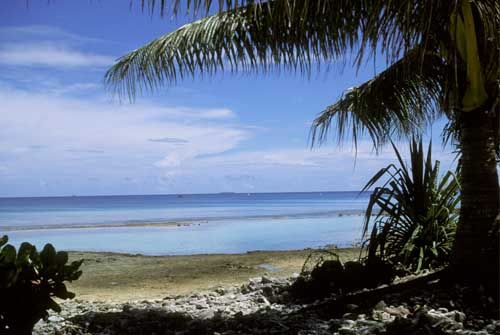
Looking west from a beach on Fongafale Islet towards Foalopa Islet (left) and Tepuka Islet (right) in the distance.

The Parliament of Tuvalu or Palamene o Tuvalu and the house of the Governor General of Tuvalu are located on Fongafale. Buildings include the offices of the government ministries and the government agencies, such as the Tuvalu Philatelic Bureau, the Tuvalu Meteorological Service, the National Bank of Tuvalu, the offices of the Tuvalu Telecommunications Corporation, and the Tuvalu National Library and Archives. The Tuvalu Media Department, which operates radio services as Radio Tuvalu, is also located on Fongafale.

== Other buildings ==
The police service has its headquarters and the jail on Fongafale. The High Court of Tuvalu is also located on Fongafale. Princess Margaret Hospital, the only hospital in Tuvalu, is located on Fongafale. Other significant buildings located on Fongafale are the Rt Hon Sir Dr Tomasi Puapua Convention Center, Tausoa Maneapa (community hall), Fetu Ao Lima (Morning Star Church) of the Church of Tuvalu and the Teone Church of the Roman Catholic Mission sui iuris of Funafuti.

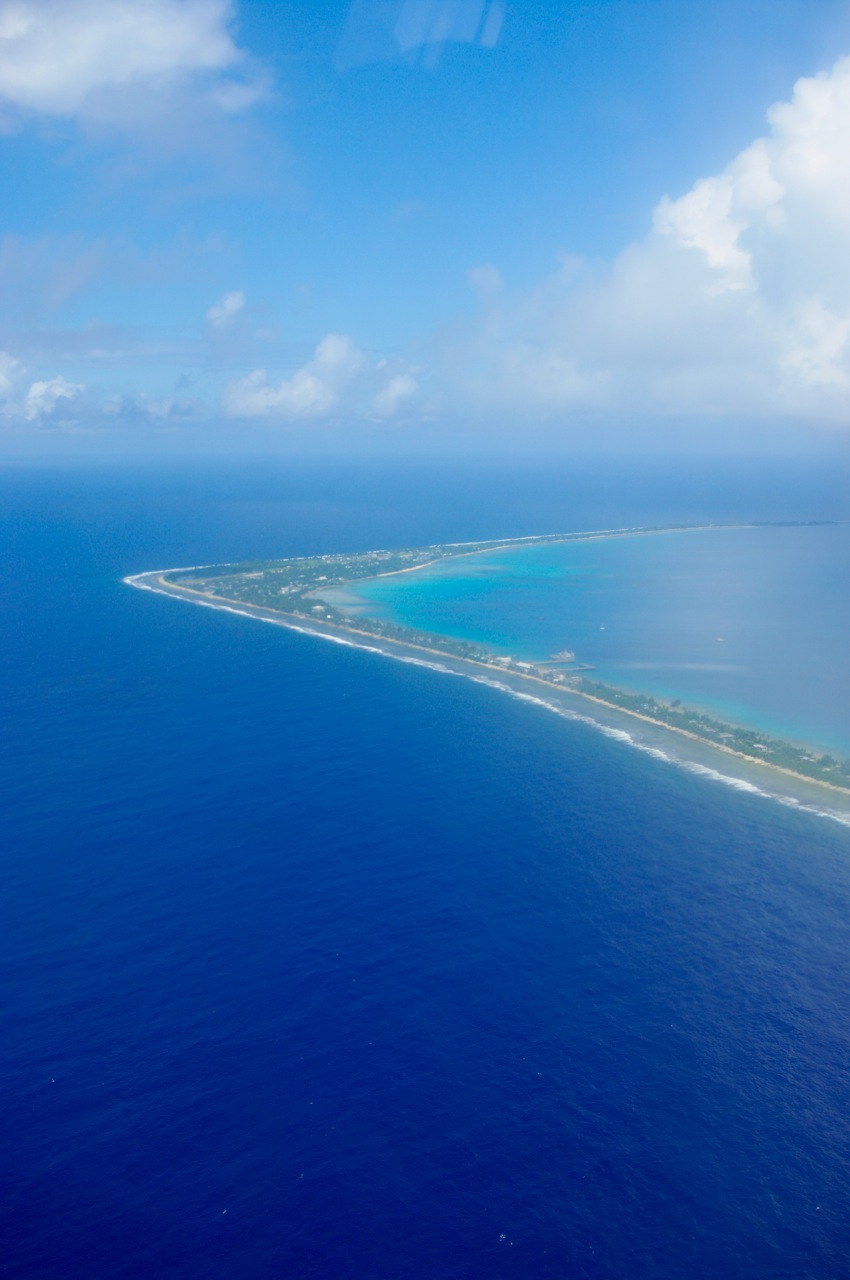
Aerial view of Tengako peninsula looking south to Fongafale

== Transportation ==
=== Air ===
Tuvalu's only airport, Funafuti International Airport, is located here. All connections are to Suva, Fiji via Fiji Airways.

=== Land ===
There are four taxis, and motorbikes are available for hire.

=== Water ===
Access to the Funafuti Conservation Area is by boat. The Conservation Area is 15 kilometres (9.3 mi) across the lagoon from the main island of Fongafale.

There are port facilities on Fongafale. Two passenger/cargo ships, Nivaga II and Manu Folau, provide round-trip visits to the outer islands every three or four weeks, and also travel between Suva, Fiji and Funafuti 3 to 4 times a year.

== Aquifer salinization of Fongafale ==
The investigation of groundwater dynamics of Fongafale Islet, Funafuti, show that tidal forcing results in salt water contamination of the surficial aquifer during spring tides. The degree of aquifer salinization depends on the specific topographic characteristics and the hydrologic controls in the sub-surface of the atoll. About half of Fongafale islet is reclaimed swamp that contains porous, highly permeable coral blocks that allow the tidal forcing of salt water.

During World War II the occupying Japanese conducted extensive swamp reclamation to create an air field. It has been adapted as the Funafuti International Airport. As a consequence of the specific topographic characteristics of Fongafale, unlike other atoll islands of a similar size, Fongafale does not have a thick freshwater lens. The narrow fresh water and brackish water sheets in the sub-surface of Fongafale islet results in the taro swamps and the fresh groundwater resources of the islet being highly vulnerable to salinization resulting from the rising sea level.

A survey of the pits that have previously been used to grow Swamp taro (Cyrtosperma merkusii), (known in Tuvalu as Pulaka) established that the pits were either too saline or very marginal for swamp taro production, even though a more salt-tolerant species of taro (Colocasia esculenta) is grown on Fongafale.

== Over-extraction of groundwater and pollution ==
In addition to the increased risk of salinization by the sea-level rise, the freshwater lens is at risk from over extraction to serve the large population that now occupies Fongafale islet. The effects of the increased extraction can be exacerbated by a decrease of the rainfall recharge rate associated with climate change. Water pollution is a chronic problem, with domestic wastewater identified as the primary pollution source. Approximately 92% of households on Fongafale islet have access to septic tanks and pit toilets. However, these sanitary facilities are not built per the design specifications, or they are not suitable for the geophysical characteristics, which results in seepage into the fresh water lens and run-off into coastal waters.

A project involving the South Pacific Applied Geoscience Commission (SOPAC) is constructing composting toilets and improving the treatment of sewage sludge from septic tanks on Fongafale in order to reduce the leakage from septic tanks into groundwater, and the ocean and lagoon.

In November 2013 the World Bank announced US$6 million in funding to improve the operational safety of the Funafuti International Airport and associated infrastructure. An 800,000-litre water cistern will be constructed to improve storage of drinking water.

== Borrow Pits Remediation (BPR) project ==
When the airfield, which is now Funafuti International Airport, was constructed during World War II, the coral base of the atoll was withdrawn to use as fill to create the runway. The resulting borrow pits adversely affected the fresh-water aquifer. In the low areas of Funafuti, the sea water can be seen bubbling up through the porous coral rock to form pools with each high tide.

Since 1994 a project has been in development to assess the environmental impact of transporting sand from the lagoon to fill all the borrow pits and low-lying areas on Fongafale. In 2013 a feasibility study was carried out and in 2014 the Tuvalu Borrow Pits Remediation (BPR) project was approved. It will result in all 10 borrow pits being filled, leaving Tafua Pond, which is a natural pond.

The New Zealand Government funded the BPR project. The project was carried out in 2015, with 365,000 sqm of sand being dredged from the lagoon to fill the holes and ultimately improve water and living conditions on the island. This project increase the usable land space on Fongafale by eight per cent.

== Tuvalu Coastal Adaptation Project ==
Tuvalu has received funding from the Green Climate Fund (GCF) to develop the Tuvalu Coastal Adaptation Project (TCAP) which has the overall objective of reducing the vulnerability of Tuvalu to the impacts of coastal hazards associated with climate change. The TCAP is a plan to construct hard and soft coastal protection infrastructure to reduce inundation and coastal erosion on the islands of Nanumaga, Nanumea and Funafuti. The implementation of the TCAP on Funafuti is proposed to be a land reclamation project on Fongafale, which will start from the northern boundary of the Queen Elizabeth Park (QEP) reclamation area and extend to the northern Tausoa Beach Groyne and the development of the Catalina Ramp Harbour.

In December 2022, work on the Funafuti reclamation project commenced. The project is to dredge sand from the lagoon, to construct a platform that is 780 metres (2,560 ft) meters long and 100 metres (330 ft) meters wide, giving a total area of approximately 7.8 ha. (19.27 acres), which is designed to remain above sea level rise and the reach of storm waves beyond the year 2100.

== External sources ==
- Hedley, Charles (1896). "General account of the Atoll of Funafuti" (PDF). Australian Museum Memoir. 3 (2): 1–72. doi:10.3853/j.0067-1967.3.1896.487. Archived from the original (PDF) on 2013-10-15.
