= Tuvaluan mythology =

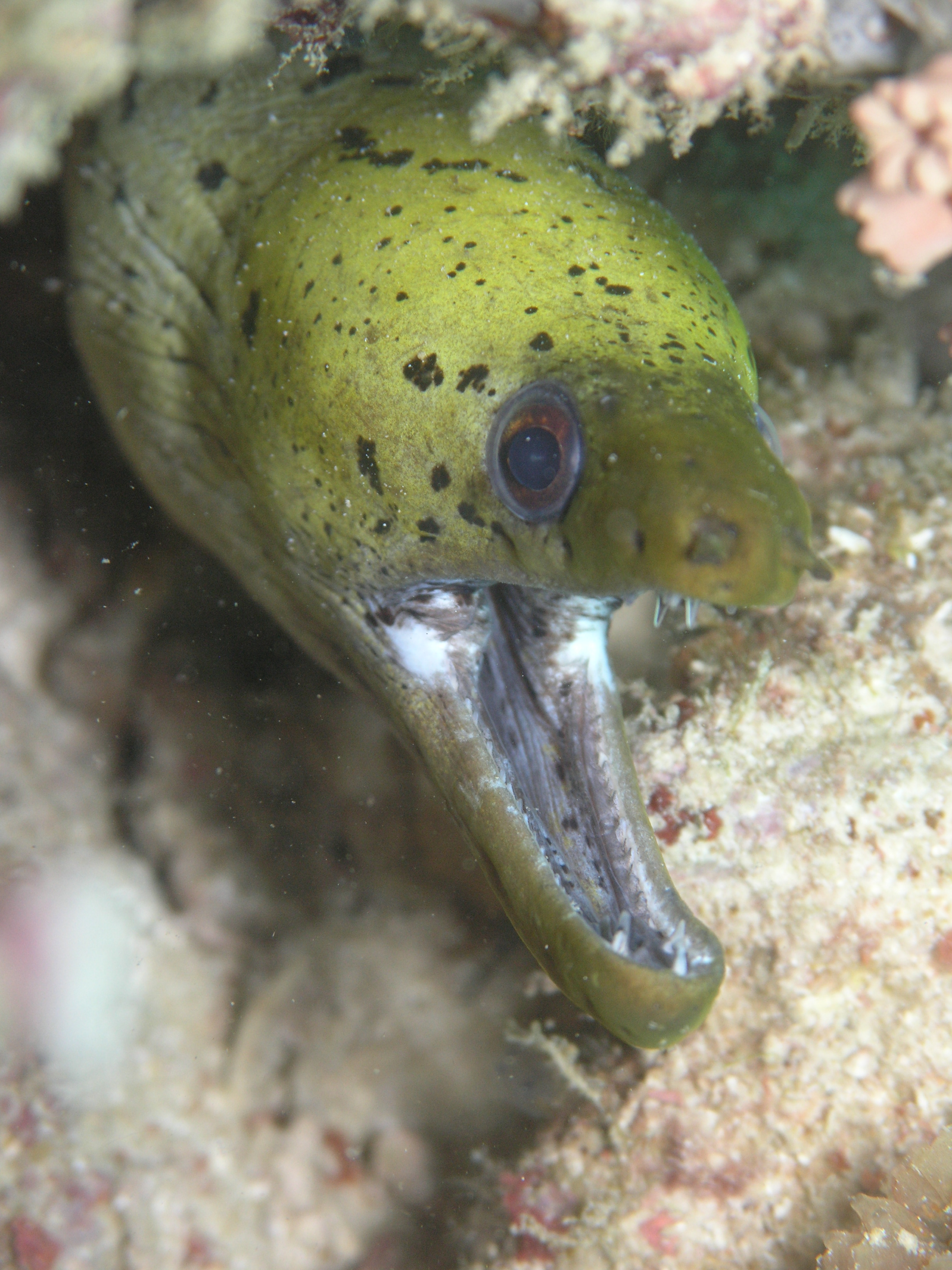
Darkspotted moray in coral Fimbriated moray (Gymnothorax fimbriatus)

Tuvaluan mythology tells stories of the creation of the islands of Tuvalu and of the founding ancestors of each island. While on some of the islands there are stories of spirits creating the islands, a creation story that is found on many of the islands is that te Pusi mo te Ali (the Eel and the Flounder) created the islands of Tuvalu; te Ali (the flounder) is believed to be the origin of the flat atolls of Tuvalu and te Pusi (the eel) is the model for the coconut palms that are important in the lives of Tuvaluans. The strength of this belief has the consequence that Moray eel are tapu and are not eaten.

== Origin myths of the people of Tuvalu ==
The reef islands and atolls of Tuvalu are identified as being part of West Polynesia. During pre-European-contact times there was frequent canoe voyaging between the islands as Polynesian navigation skills are recognised to have allowed deliberate journeys on double-hulled sailing canoes or outrigger canoes. The pattern of settlement that is believed to have occurred is that the Polynesians spread out from Tonga and the Samoan Islands into the Tuvaluan atolls. The distinct linguistic areas that have been recognised in the islands of Tuvalu shows that the Tongan influence is stronger in the northern islands of Nanumea and Nanumaga rather than in the south.

The stories as to the ancestors of the Tuvaluans vary from island to island. On some of the islands there are stories of spirits creating the island, however a creation story that is found on many of the islands is that te Pusi mo te Ali (the Eel and the Flounder) created the islands of Tuvalu.

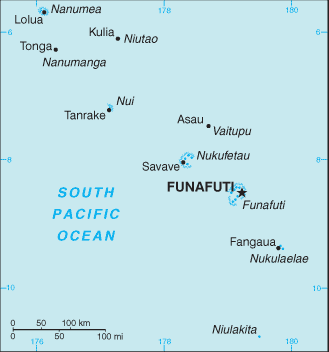
A map of Tuvalu.

The voyaging ancestors brought the myths from their islands of origin, with these stories being adapted to over time to become the mythology of Tuvalu. Each island has stories as to the origins of their ancestors. On Funafuti and Vaitupu the founding ancestor is described as being as Telematua (or Telemaiatua), a giant from Samoa; whereas on Nukufetau the ancestors are described as being from Tonga.

On Nanumea the founding ancestor is described as being from Tonga, although Nanumea also has links to Tokelau. The ancestor of the people of Nanumea is described as Tefolaha, who was part human, part spirit from Tonga; on Nanumaga the founding ancestor is described as Tepuhi, a spirit with the shape of a sea-serpent, who came originally from Fiji, although there are other creation stories that are told on Nanumaga that have links to Tonga and Samoa.

The creation story told on Nui describes a group of spirits raising the eleven islets of Nui from the ocean floor and the ancestors arrived from Samoa on a canoe named Vakatiumalie. The captain of the canoe was Peau, a man from Manono Island in Samoa.

On Niutao the understanding is that their ancestors came from Samoa in the 12th or 13th century. Niutaon mythology tells the story of the people who first inhabited the island: "The first inhabitants of Niutao were half spirit and half human beings who lived at Mulitefao. Their leader was Kulu who took the form of a woman. The first human settlers came from Samoa in a canoe captained by a man called Mataika. He settled at Tamana on the eastern side of the island, where winds swept the spray of the surf over the reef."

== The Legendary History of Funafuti ==
In 1896 Professor Professor William Sollas went to Funafuti as the leader of the Funafuti Coral Reef Boring Expedition of the Royal Society; Prof. Sollas subsequently published The Legendary History of Funafuti, an oral history given by Erivara, the chief of Funafuti, through the trader Jack O’Brien (as translator), which began:

THE first king of Funafuti was Terematua (? Tilimatua), but who he was or where he came from is not known; it is certain, however, he was here before the arrival of the Kauga, people who swam to this island from Samoa, which means, I take it, Samoans who were wrecked from a canoe and afterwards swam ashore. The Kauga were much respected. Toa, a piece of land in Funafuti, is named after one of them, and the southernmost island, Tuaeriki, after another : after death they were worshipped as spirits.

== Nanumean myths ==
=== Pai and Vau ===
Upon arriving in Nanumea, legendary hero, Tefolaha, is said to have found it inhabited by two women, Pai and Vau. Tefolaha made an agreement with Pai and Vau that he could have Nanumea if he could guess their names and they could guess his, because in Polynesian culture to know someone's name was to have power over them. Tefolaha would climb a palm tree and use a wooden hook on a piece of twine to trick the women into shouting their names. He would guess their names correctly but they would not be able to guess his and would be forced to leave. Nanumean traditions describe the islets, Te Motu Foliki, Lafogaki, and Teaafua a Taepoa, as being formed when sand spilled from the baskets of two women, Pai and Vau, when they were forced off Nanumea.

=== Defeat of Tuulapoupou and the Tongans ===
One of Tefolaha's descendants was Lapi. After a careless fisherman accidentally tossed a fish hook into the eye of Lupo, a Tongan prince, the Tongans sent a raiding party, led by a giant, to Nanumea. Lapi would slay the giant Tuulapoupou on Nanumea's southwestern reef flat. While doing this, Lapi had to call the spirit of Tefolaha for help, via saying the phrase, "Tefolaha tou hoa!" Today, Nanumeans will pour the last of their drink on the ground (if the drink is pi or kaleve/coconut sap) and say "Tefolaha tou hoa!", as a way of honoring Tefolaha. The phrase is thought to hold magical power for Nanumeans and can help one even if they so much as think it. There are Nanumean holidays dedicated to Tefolaha and Lapi as well, known as Te Po o Tefolaha and Po Lahi. Tefolaha's sons and daughters are today the founding ancestors of leading families and the seven chiefly lineages of Nanumea.

=== The Kaumaile ===
Tefolaha would bring a wooden spear to Nanumea known as the Kaumaile. The Kaumaile is one of the most precious relics of Nanumea. Tefolaha had used the miraculous weapon in battles in Samoa and Tonga. It was the weapon Lapi used to kill Tuulapoupou.

== te Pusi mo te Ali (the Eel and the Flounder) ==
There are some stories that are shared by all the islands of Tuvalu. An important creation myth of the islands of Tuvalu is the story of te Pusi mo te Ali (the Eel and the Flounder). The story of te Pusi mo te Ali is told by Talakatoa O’Brien in Tuvalu: A History. The essence of the story is that the Eel and the Flounder were once great friends. One day they decided to carry a huge stone to test who was the stronger. They began to argue and then to fight. As they fought the Flounder was crushed flat beneath the stone. The Flounder became free and chased the Eel who was vomiting after getting a heavy blow to his stomach. The Eel became thinner and thinner until the Eel could hide in a hole. The Eel said some magic words as protection from the Flounder:

Wide and Flat, Wide and Flat,
To feed on you, te Ali.
Wide and Flat, Wide and Flat,
You will never, never kill me.

The Flounder's flat body became the model for the atolls of Tuvalu. The Eel's thin round body became the model for the coconut palm. After the Flounder died the Eel threw the stone in the air and said the magic words:

Black, white and blue,
I will always be true,
To myself and to you, too,
To make you and me friends.

By repeatedly throwing the stone in the air the Eel created night and day, the blue sky and the sea. The Eel then broke the stone into eight pieces to create the main islands of Tuvalu. The name, Tuvalu, means "eight standing together" in Tuvaluan.

The story of te Pusi mo te Ali can be compared to the story of Sina and the Eel from Samoan mythology, which also explains the origins of the first coconut tree.
