= Kaumaile =

Historic wooden spear of Nanumea, Tuvalu

- Type: Spear
- Place of origin: Samoa or Tonga

Service history
- Used by: Tefolaha, Lapi
- Wars: unspecified battles in Samoa, Tu'i Tonga's invasion of Nanumea

Specifications
- Length: 1.8m

The Kaumaile is a wooden spear (katipopuki) treasured by the people of Nanumea, Tuvalu. According to Nanumean myth, it was brought to the island by Tefolaha, from Samoa or Tonga, and had been used in battle, including to kill giants. The spear is central to Nanumean traditional history as their most important ancestral relic, and is featured on the letterhead of the Nanumean kaupule and the letterhead of NanuFuti, a community of Nanumeans in Funafuti.

== Description ==
The Kaumaile is approximately 1.8 metres (5 ft 11 in) in length. It is heavy, and made of a dense, dark brown, fine-grained wood from an Australian pine tree. Its blade is flared and has raised welts where the handle widens to become the blade. The spear was made circa. 1070 A.D. It is considered a mea Taaua by the Nanumeans, which means it is highly valued or precious.

== History ==
=== Origin ===
The Kaumaile is believed to have been brought to Nanumea by Tefolaha (circa 1375 AD), from either Samoa or Tonga, where he had used it valiantly in battle. Upon arriving in Nanumea, Tefolaha is said to have found it inhabited by two women, Pai and Vau. Tefolaha made an agreement with Pai and Vau that he could have Nanumea if he could guess their names and they could guess his, because in Polynesian culture to know someone's name was to have power over them. Tefolaha would climb a palm tree and use a wooden hook on a piece of twine to trick the women into shouting their names. He would guess their names correctly but they would not be able to guess his and would be forced to leave. Nanumean traditions describe the islets, Te Motu Foliki, Lafogaki, and Teaafua a Taepoa, as being formed when sand spilled from the baskets of two women, Pai and Vau, when they were forced off Nanumea. Upon Tefolaha's death, his descendants would inherit the spear, and upon their death, their descendants would, which continued for ~23 generations.

One of Tefolaha's descendants was Lapi. After a careless fisherman accidentally tossed a fish hook into the eye of Lupo, a Tongan prince, the Tongans sent a raiding party, led by a giant, to Nanumea. Lapi would use the Kaumaile to slay the giant Tuulapoupou on Nanumea's southwestern reef flat. While doing this, Lapi had to call the spirit of Tefolaha for help, via saying the phrase, "Tefolaha tou hoa!"

=== Modern day ===
In the either the late 1890s or early 1900s, G. B. Smith Rewse (known to the Nanumeans as Misi Lusi), a British colonial administrator, came to know about the Kaumaile. He was given spear by Teuki, a descendant of Lapi, and it was taken to England. The Kaumaile was given up willingly, the Nanumeans likely hoping the officials would provide them with more information on the spear's age and where it originated. Tests were conducted, according to Nanumean elders, but they do not know which ones or any details. Regardless, they apparently proved the spear was roughly 8 centuries old at the time.

The Kaumaile was lost for many years afterward. In 1936 or 1937, Teuki's descendant, Manuella, who was working in the phosphate mines on Banaba, noticed the Kaumaile in one of the mine's offices (said by most sources to belong to a Mr. Barley, and by Manuella to a Mr. McClure). He reclaimed the spear and brought it back to Nanumea some time in the late 1930s.

In 1974 the Kaumaile was entrusted to Seselo by his adoptive father, Manuella.

According to Keith Chambers, Seselo had died by April 2025. Seselo had given the Kaumaile to the chiefly council decades before his death and the Kaumaile is currently in the possession of the Pule Kaupule (elected chief of Nanumea).

== Tefolaha in culture ==
Today, Nanumeans will pour the last of their drink on the ground (if the drink is pi or kaleve/coconut sap) and say "Tefolaha tou hoa!", as a way of honoring Tefolaha. The phrase is thought to hold magical power for Nanumeans and can help one even if they so much as think it.

There is a Nanumea holiday dedicated to Tefolaha, known as Te Po o Tefolaha. Tefolaha's sons and daughters are today the founding ancestors of leading families and the seven chiefly lineages of Nanumea.
