= Public holidays in Tuvalu =

The following are public holidays in Tuvalu.

Date	English name	Tuvaluan name
1 January	New Year's Day	Tausaga Fou
Second Monday in March	Commonwealth Day	
moveable in autumn	Good Friday	
moveable in autumn	Easter Monday	
Second Monday in May	Gospel Day	Te Aso o te Tala Lei
Second Saturday in June (can vary if appointed differently)	King's Official Birthday	
First Monday in August	National Children's Day	Aso Tamaliki
1 October (public holiday continues 2 October)	Tuvalu Day	
25 December	Christmas Day	Kilisimasi
26 December	Boxing Day	

Also, the regions observe the following regional holidays:

Date	Atoll/Island	Name	Remarks
8 January	Nanumea	Te Po o Tefolaha	Called Aso Pati by the Church, it is a day to commemorate the founder of the community, Tefolaha. It was the day Nanumea embraced Christianity.
3 February	Nanumea	Po Lahi	Celebrated with a feast in the ahiga
11 February	Nukufetau	Te Aso o Tutasi	Honors the Tutasi school.
16 February	Nui	Bogin te Ieka (Day of the Flood)	Commemorates the Tsunami that struck the island on that day in 1882.
15 April	Nanumaga	Aho o te Fakavae	
23 April	Funafuti	Te Aso o te Paula (The day of the bombing)	Commemorates the day during the Pacific War (World War II) when 10 to 20 people took refuge in the concrete walled, pandanus-thatched church from a Japanese bombing raid. Corporal Fonnie Black Ladd, USMCR, persuaded them to get into dugouts, then a bomb struck the building shortly after.
moveable in May	Nukulaelae	Aso o te Tala Lei	Island-specific Gospel Day.
17 September	Niutao	Te Aso o te Setema	
21 October	Funafuti	Cyclone Day	Commemorates Cyclone Bebe's destruction of Funafuti in 1972.
25 November	Vaitupu	Te Aso Fiafia (Happy Day)	Commemorates 25 November 1887 which was the date on which the final instalment of a debt of $13,000 was repaid to H. M. Ruge and Company.
