= Lakina =

Lakina may refer to:

- Lakina (tribe), Assyria
- Lakina River, Alaska, US
- Soane Patita Lakina, past-president, Territorial Assembly of Wallis and Futuna

== See also ==
- Lakena, an island in Tuvalu
