= Te Po o Tefolaha =

Religious holiday celebrated by the people of Nanumea, Tuvalu

- Official name: Aso Pati
- Also called: Golden Jubilee, Day of the Pentecost of the Children of Tefolaha for Jesus
- Observed by: Nanumea
- Type: Christian
- Celebrations: Feasting, Fatele, Putu Lama, Solo
- Date: January 8
- Frequency: Annual
- First time: 1922
- Started by: Peniata

Te Po o Tefolaha (English: the Day of Tefolaha), also known as the Golden Jubilee, or Aso Pati to the church, is a regional holiday celebrated annually by the people of Nanumea, Tuvalu, on January 8. To the Nanumeans, its significance rivals that of Christmas. It is a part of Po Lahi, the Nanumean holiday season.

== History ==
=== Origins ===
Te Po o Tefolaha is celebrated on the day that Nanumeans were converted to Christianity by Samoan pastors from the London Missionary Society, an Evangelical church. The holiday started in 1922, the 50th anniversary of Christianity being brought to Nanumea. The pastor, Peniata, wanted this day to be an island-wide occasion. To realize this plan, the Christian Nanumeans, including Peniata, went from door to door singing hymns in a bid to convince those who still worshiped Tefolaha and the old Tuvaluan gods. The elder, Peni, headed one of the non-Christian families, and was so moved by the hymns, as well as the collaboration between the Nanumean Christians, that he accepted Christianity. Peni's relatives wept but accepted his decision and with that almost all of Nanumea was Christian. In celebration of this, there was a feast and dancing in the ahiga, and a cement monument was erected near the ahiga. In the 1930s, the Nanumean church, Loto Lelei, was constructed from stone and limestone cement. It was called Te Po o Tefolaha because he founded Nanumea and they had once worshiped Tefolaha as their god.

More than 20 years later, the pastor, Iosefa, declared the holiday's name should be changed to Aso Pati, or Pati Day. It means the Day of the Pentecost of the Children of Tefolaha for Jesus (Tuvaluan: Aso Pentekoso Alo Tamaliki o Tefolaha mo Iesu).

When the federal government requested that each district select a national holiday, Nanumea chose Te Po o Tefolaha.

=== Spread of Putu Lama ===
By 1939, some of the other districts of Tuvalu had embraced the Putu Lama tradition. Men meant to be working on Banaba were sent to Nanumea to wait for the ships that would take them to Banaba, but the ships were delayed by the Japanese invasion of Banaba. Those men would take part in the Te Po o Tefolaha celebrations, and bring Putu Lama back to their islands.

== Observance and traditions ==
=== Feast and Dancing ===
Te Po o Tefolaha is celebrated every year with a games and a feast in the ahiga. Oftentimes the people of Nanumea will fish for all night to prepare for the feast. In the evening there is fatele dancing that lasts all night (there is usually around 200 dancers at the peak of the celebrations) and it is customary to donate money to the church. On this day, the pastor's books are also opened for anyone who wanted to be appointed as a volunteer for the congregation.

=== Putu Lama ===
Putu Lama (English: short torch) is a tradition that takes place during the dancing, where Nanumean elders question the young bachelors about their crushes and try to get them to light their putu-lamas. If someone does, the bachelor lets the elders take their marriage proposal to their sweetheart for them. Often several marriages occur as a result of this practice.

=== Solo ===
Another tradition is solo (English: lining up), where during fatele, two plates are placed on a centered table on the side of the ahiga closest to the shore. Each plate is for one of the groups of dancers and a cashier collects coins for each group. The amount donated by each group is announced hourly. The money raised goes to maintaining Loto Lelei. After a whole night of dancing, hundreds of dollars may have been raised.
