= Nanumea dialect =

Dialect of Tuvaluan; possibly a separate language

Nanumea
- Nanumean
- Te Gagana Faka Nanumea/Te 'Gana Faka Nanumea
- Pronunciation: te ŋa'ŋana ˈfaka nanuˈmea/te 'ŋːana 'faka nanu'mea
- Native to: Nanumea, Tuvalu
- Region: Polynesia
- Native speakers: Uncertain
- Language family: Austronesian: Malayo-Polynesian; Oceanic; Polynesian; Nuclear Polynesian; Ellicean; Tuvaluan ?; Northern ?; Nanumea
- Writing system: Latin script

Language codes
- ISO 639-3: –

The Nanumea dialect, also known as te 'Gana Faka Nanumea or Nanumean, is a dialect of Tuvaluan, also considered by some to be a separate language, spoken on the island of Nanumea in northern Tuvalu. It is part of the Northern dialect group of Tuvaluan, and is closely related to other Polynesian languages, especially the languages of the Polynesian outliers, such as Tuvaluan, Nukuoro, Kapingamarani, Samoan and Tokelauan, and less so related to more well-known Polynesian languages such as Māori and 'Ōlelo Hawai'i. There is one Nanumean lexicon.

== Phonology ==
Nanumea's phonemes are the same as to the phonemes of other northern dialects of the Tuvaluan language, as can be observed:

=== Vowels ===
	Short		Long	
	Front	Back	Front	Back
Close	i	u	iː	uː
Mid	e	o	eː	oː
Open	a		aː	

=== Consonants ===
	Labial		Alveolar	Velar	Glottal
Nasal	m		n	ŋ	
Plosive	p		t	k	
Fricative	f	v			h
Lateral			l		

Consonants can also be germinated, just like Tuvaluan.

== Challenges ==
Nanumea may eventually sink completely below sea level by the near future, which is a threat to te 'Gana Faka Nanumea, because if the atoll was no longer there, there would be no use for Nanumean.

== Similarities and differences with standard Tuvaluan ==
English	Nanumea	Tuvaluan	Additional information
Cat	Puuhi	Pūsi	/s/ turns into /h/ in northern dialects and, to an extent, the Nukulaelae dialect
Spouse	Aavaga	Āvaga	
Idea	Aofaga	Manatu	
Gold	Aulo	Aulo	Latin loanword
To fold	Fefetu/Taketake	Sai	
Bat (Instrument)	Pate	Pate	
Table	Laulau	Taipola	
To help	Fakamaamaa	Fesoasoani	
Fly (Insect)	Lago	Lago	
Nominalizer suffix	-a	-ga	'-a' is also used in Tokelauan.
Ten	Agafulu	Sefulu/Hefulu	'Agafulu' seems to also have been used in older Tuvaluan, as is described by Donald G. K., though more modern dictionaries cite 'sefulu' as the used word for ten, though in compound words 'agafulu' seems to have maintained, e.g. agafulumaikao ten coconuts.

== See also ==
- Tuvaluan Language
- Nanumea atoll
- Fatele, Fakanau, Fakaseasesa
- Polynesian outliers
