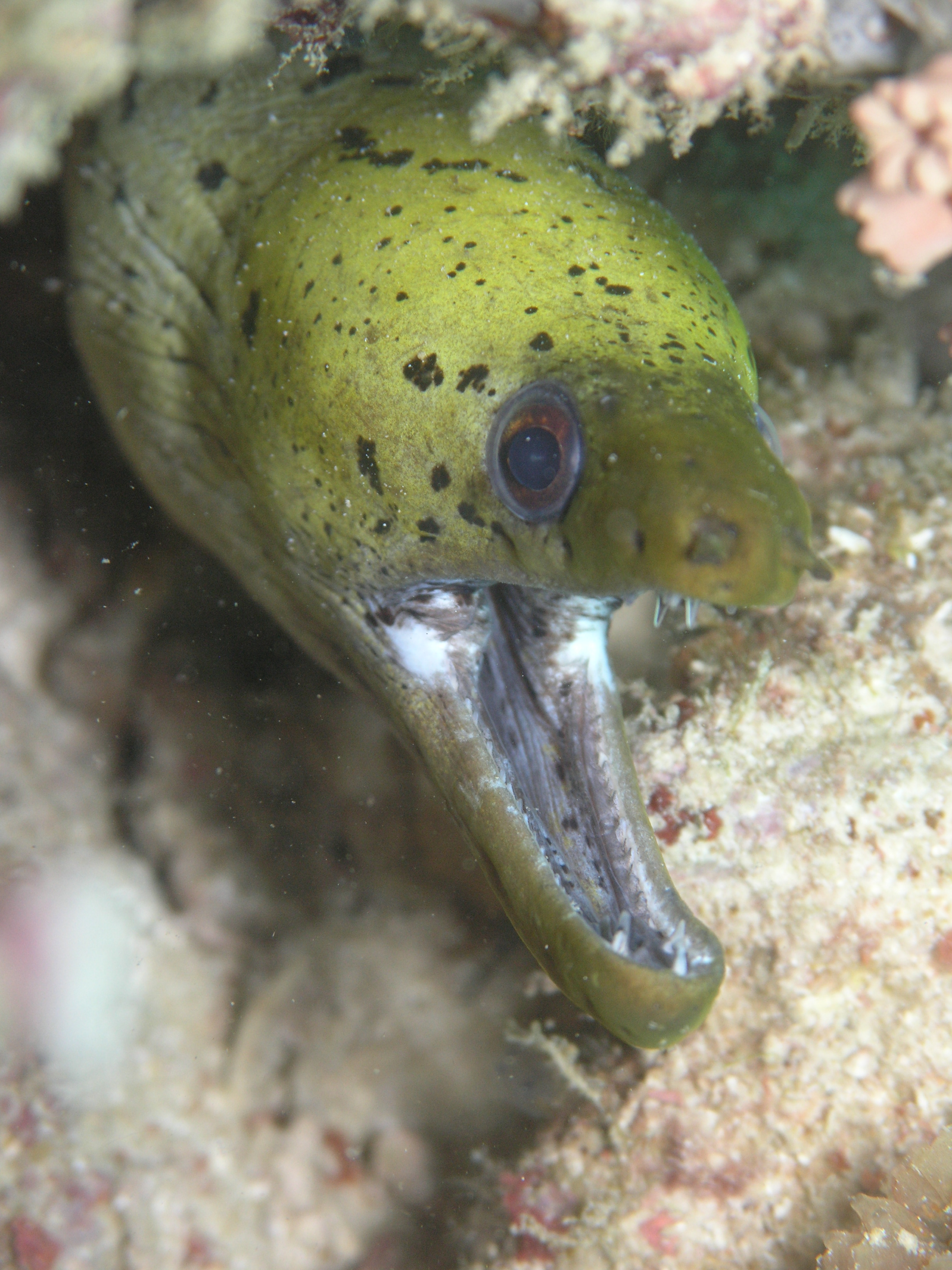

Conservation status
- Least Concern (IUCN 3.1)

Scientific classification
- Kingdom: Animalia
- Phylum: Chordata
- Class: Actinopterygii
- Division: Teleostei
- Order: Anguilliformes
- Family: Muraenidae
- Genus: Gymnothorax
- Species: G. fimbriatus

Binomial name
- Gymnothorax fimbriatus (E. T. Bennett, 1832)

= Fimbriated moray =

Species of fish

The fimbriated moray (Gymnothorax fimbriatus), also known as dark-spotted moray or spot-face moray, is a moray eel of the family Muraenidae.

== Description ==
Gymnothorax fimbriatus is a medium-sized moray which can reach a maximum length of 80 centimetres (31 in). Its serpentine in shape body has a white cream to light brown background color dotted with numerous black spots which latter vary in size and shape depending on the individual and maturity. Its head has a tapered snout and it is greenish-yellow with black dots, the corners of the mouth are white.

== Distribution and habitat ==
The spot-face moray is widespread throughout the tropical waters of the Indo-Pacific area, mainly on the coastal reefs of oceanic islands from Madagascar to Polynesia and from south Japan to New Caledonia.

It lives in protected areas on the outer slopes of coral reefs, top reefs, lagoons and harbors. During the day, it sits sheltered in crevices between 1 and 50 metres (3–164 ft) deep.

== Biology ==
The fimbriated moray is carnivorous. It leaves its lair at night to actively hunt its preys along the reef. It feeds mainly on small fish and crustaceans.
