= Lakena =

Island in Nanumea atoll, Tuvalu

Coordinates: 5°38′49.92″S 176°04′02.64″E

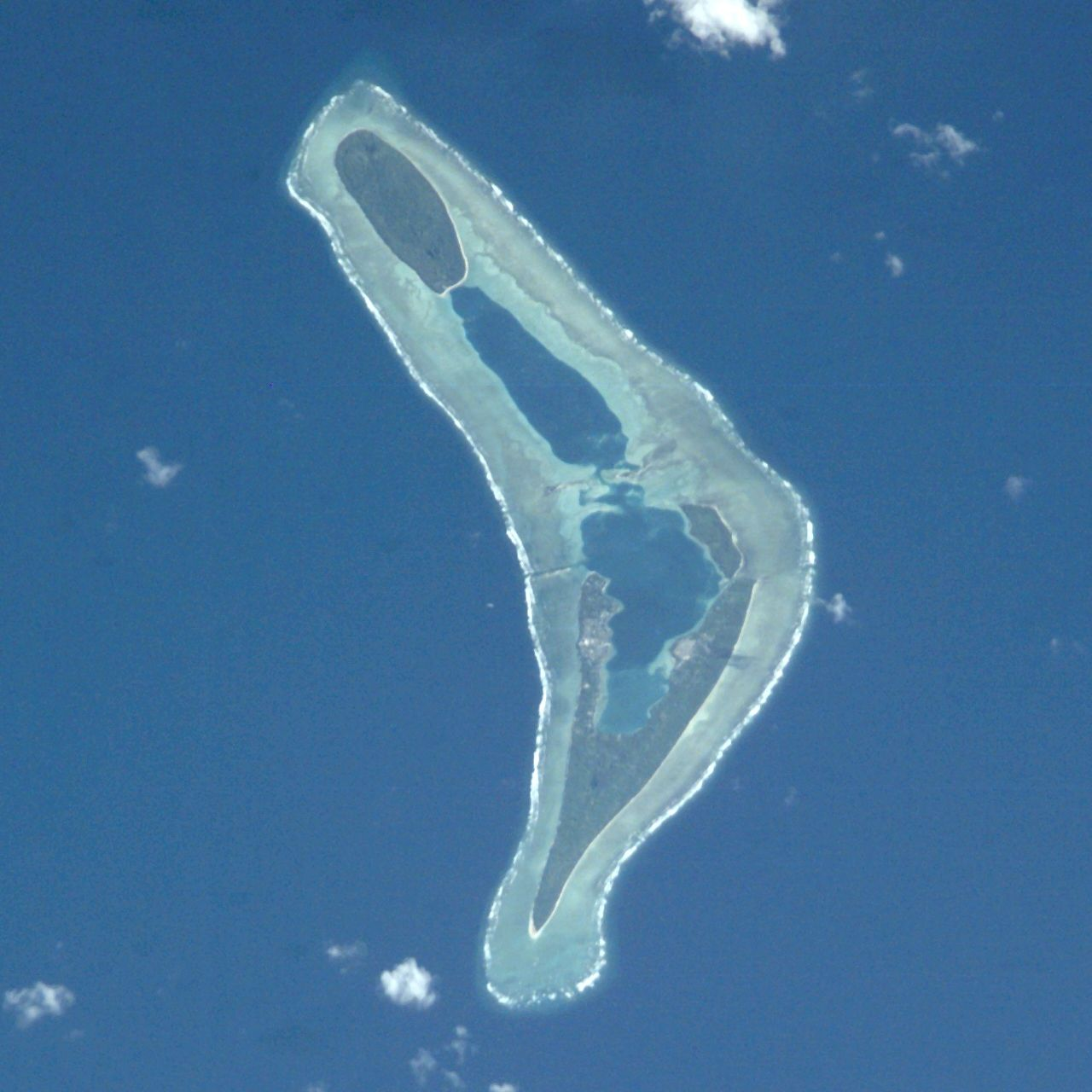

Lake na or Lakina is an islet of Nanumea atoll, Tuvalu. Nanumean traditions describe Lakena as being formed when sand spilled from the baskets of two women, Pai and Vau, when they were forced off Nanumea by Tefolaha, the Tongan warrior who became the ancestor of the people of Nanumea.

The pulaka pits are located on Lake na as the Nanumeans want the main island of Nanumea to remain mosquito free. Pulaka is grown in large pits of composted soil below the water table. During World War II the people of Nanumea moved to Lakena so that the American forces could build an airfield on Nanumea.

Lakena is also home to one of Nanumea's many fishing spots, Te Tongo Pond.

== See also ==
- Lakena United
