= Te ano =

Traditional sport in the South Pacific

Te ano (The ball)
- First played: Traditional

Characteristics
- Contact: None
- Mixed-sex: Mixed gender or single gender
- Type: Played on a beach, grass, or a hard surface
- Equipment: Leaf ball, woven from dried pandanus or coconut leaves

Presence
- Country or region: Tuvalu, Tokelau & Sikaiana

Te ano is a team sport played with 2 balls in which two teams face each other about 7 metres (23 ft) apart on a malae (meeting ground or playing field). Two balls are used simultaneously in the game with each ball being about 12 centimetres (4.7 in) in diameter, It is a traditional game played in Tuvalu, and also in the Pacific Islands of Tokelau & Sikaiana.

The team members stand in parallel rows of about six people behind two central players on their team, the captain and catcher. The alovaka (captain) and tino pukepuke (catcher) stand in front of each team, who are the vaka.

A game starts on the call of an elder spectator, both catchers of each team throw a ball to their captain, who in turn hits it towards the other team. Each team tries to score points by forcing the grounding of a ball in the other team's court. A tactic is to target the less skilful members of the other team.

Using their hand, a player hits a ball to another player on their team, with the receiver needing to stop the ball from hitting the ground, but without catching the ball, with the aim of hitting the ball to another player on the team, and eventually to the catcher of the team. Only the catcher can throw the ball back to the captain to hit it back to the other team. When either ball falls to the ground the other team scores a point, and the first team to score 10 points wins the game.

When the game finishes, the winning team will sing and perform a fatele, while the losing team will sit down and watch the winning team as they sing and dance the fatele.

The balls are woven by men and women who use three strips of dried pandanus or coconut leaves to weave a core followed by an outer layer. The ball is very hard and heavy as the core is usually filled with a mixture of things such as dried leaves, pieces of coconut shell, and small stones.

The ano can be woven in a round shape, or can be in the form of a cube, which can be woven with dyed pandanus leaves to create a patterned ano. The cube shaped ano is also used in the Tuvaluan game called poo ili. While Te ano is played by mixed gender teams and with team members of different ages, it is also played in single gender games. Female teams may choose to play with the cube shaped ano, while males may prefer to play with the round shaped ano.
