= Tefolaha =

Nanumean mythological figure

- Born: Samoa or Tonga
- Era: Between the 13th and 16th centuries
- Known for: Founding the settlement on Nanumea
- Opponents: Pai; Vau; Tulaapoupou; Tongan Warriors
- Relatives: Lapi; Teuki; Manuella; Seselo; all Nanumeans

Tefolaha was the founder of the community on Nanumea in Tuvalu.

== Life ==
Tefolaha is described by Nanumean oral tradition as a great warrior who came from either Samoa (by most sources) or Tonga (by some sources). Tefolaha found Nanumea inhabited by two women, Pai and Vau. Tefolaha made an agreement with Pai and Vau that he could have Nanumea if he could guess their names and they could guess his, because in Polynesian culture to know someone's name was to have power over them. Tefolaha climbed a palm tree and used a wooden hook on a piece of twine to trick the women into shouting their names. He guessed their names correctly, but they could not guess his and were forced to leave. The islets Te Motu Foliki, Lafogaki, and Teaafua a Taepoa are said to have formed when sand spilled from the baskets of the women as they fled Nanumea.

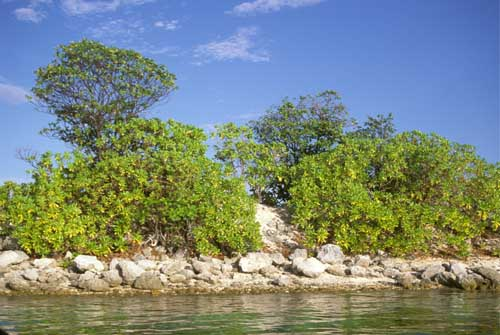
Beach of Nanumea Atoll

=== Kaumaile ===
Tefolaha brought with him from Nanumea a magical spear called Kaumaile. He used it in battle, and some legends claim he used it to slay giants. The spear was passed down to each of Tefolaha's descendants and is presently kept by the Nanumean tribal chief. There have been roughly 23 generations since Tefolaha passed on the spear.

Accelerator mass spectrometry testing has estimated that the Kaumaile was made in the 11th century.

== Legacy ==
Today, Nanumeans pour the last of their drink on the ground (if the drink is pi or kaleve/coconut sap) and say "Tefolaha tou hoa!", as a way of honoring Tefolaha. The phrase is thought to hold magical power for Nanumeans and can help one even if they so much as think it. It originates from Tefolaha's descendant, Lapi's, use of the phrase in his fight against the giant Tulaapoupou.

There is a Nanumean holiday dedicated to Tefolaha, known as Te Po o Tefolaha. Tefolaha's sons and daughters are the founding ancestors of contemporary leading families and the seven chiefly lineages of Nanumea.

Contemporary Nanumeans refer to themselves as the "Children of Tefolaha," and revered him as a god before the advent of Christianity.

== Genealogy ==
Tefolaha is said to have been a teanti-ma-aomata (half-human and half-spirit being).

The Seven Chiefly Lineages of Nanumea are all Tefolaha's descendants. Other notable direct descendants of Tefolaha include:

- Lapi, who used the Kaumaile to slay a giant and defended Nanumea from the Tongans
- Teuki, who gave the Kaumaile to the English circa. 1900
- Manuella, who returned the Kaumaile to the Nanumean people in the late 1930s
- Seselo, the adopted son of Manuella and thus not biologically Tefolaha's descendant; regardless, he inherited the Kaumaile from Manuella in 1978
