= Lefogaki =

Islet in Nanumea atoll, Tuvalu

Coordinates: 5.6638°S 176.1008°E

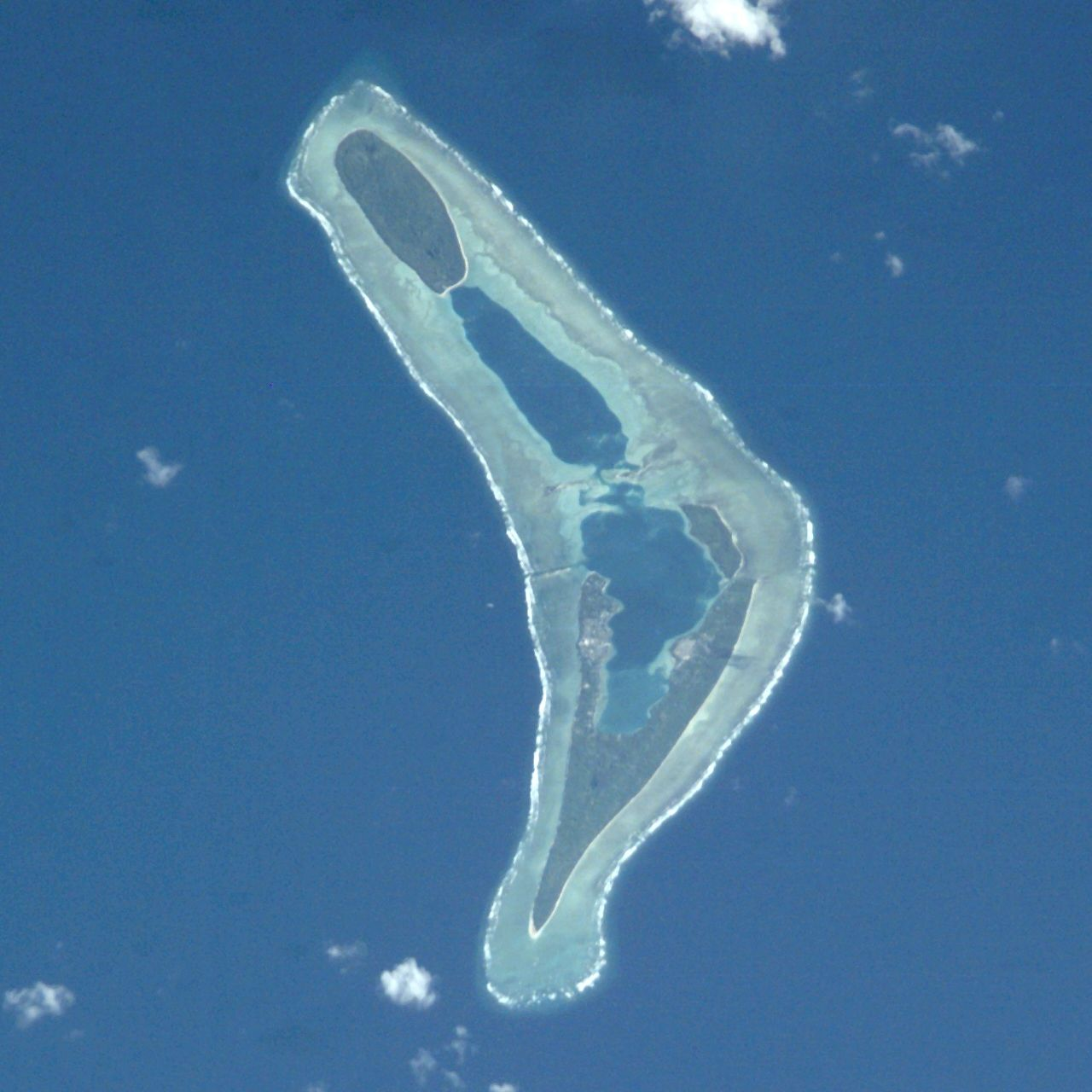
Satellite imagery of Nanumea where the Lefogaki Island belong

Lafogaki is an islet of Nanumea atoll, Tuvalu. It is a small uninhabited islet, which Nanumean traditions describe as being formed when sand spilled from the baskets of two women, Pai and Vau, when they were forced off Nanumea by Tefolaha, the Tongan warrior who became the ancestor of the people of Nanumea.

== See also ==
- Desert island
- List of islands
