= Fale Fatu =

Island in Funafuti atoll, Tuvalu

Coordinates: 8°34′52″S 179°07′01″E

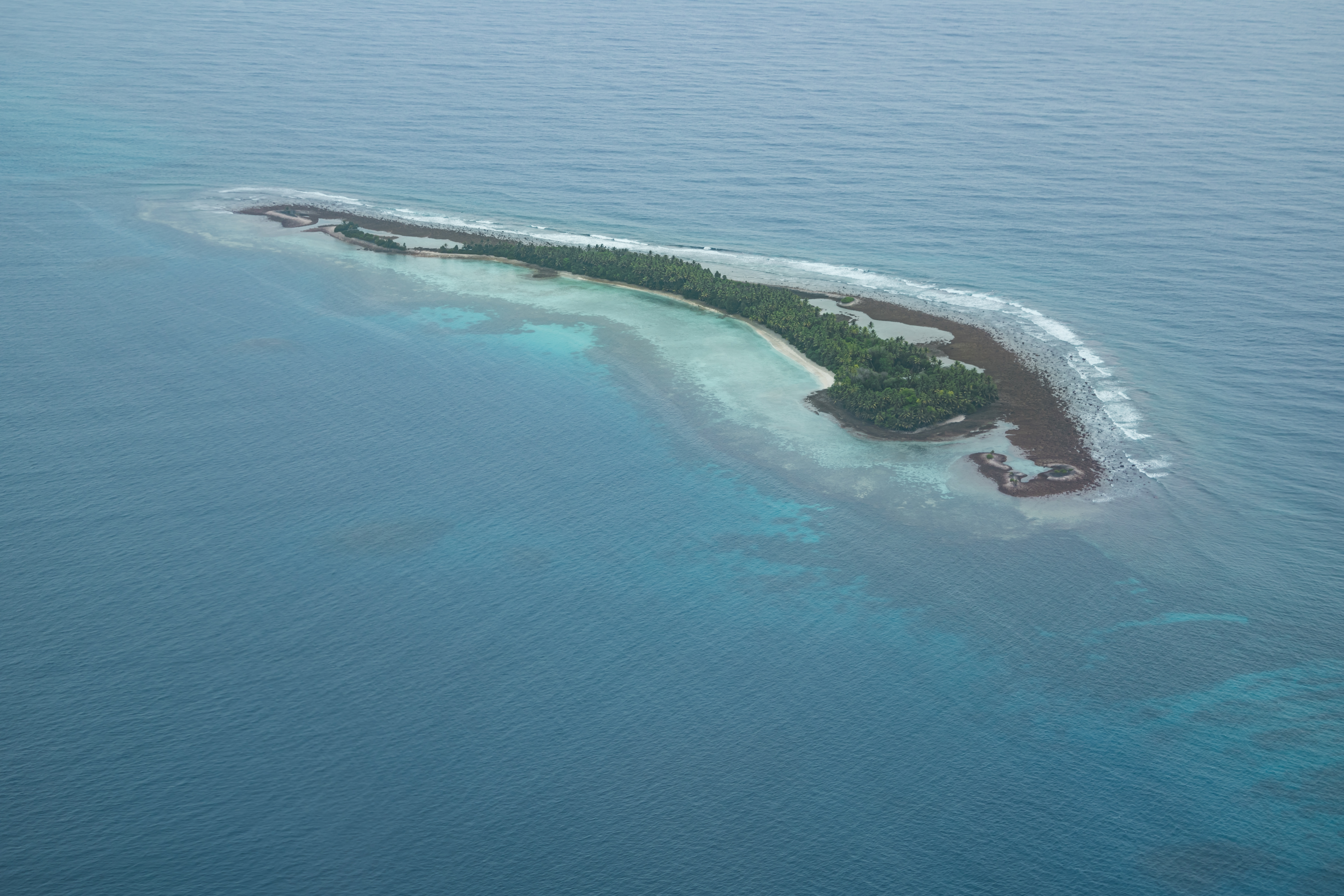
Fale Fatu in 2024

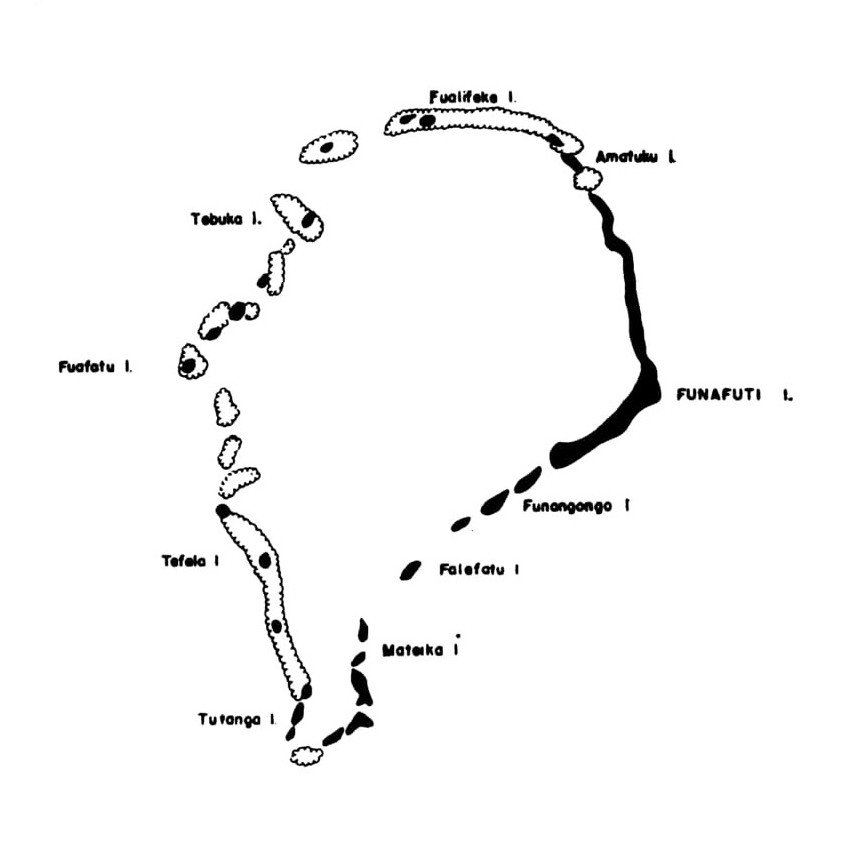
Map of Funafuti with Falefatu on the bottom left

Fale Fatu (or Falefatu) is an islet of Funafuti, Tuvalu. Te Ava Pua Pua is the passage through the reef, with a least depth of 12.7 metres, between the islets of Funamanu to the north and Fale Fatu to the south, in the southeast of Funafuti atoll.
