= Funamanu =

Island in Funafuti atoll, Tuvalu

Coordinates: 8°33′55″S 179°07′59″E

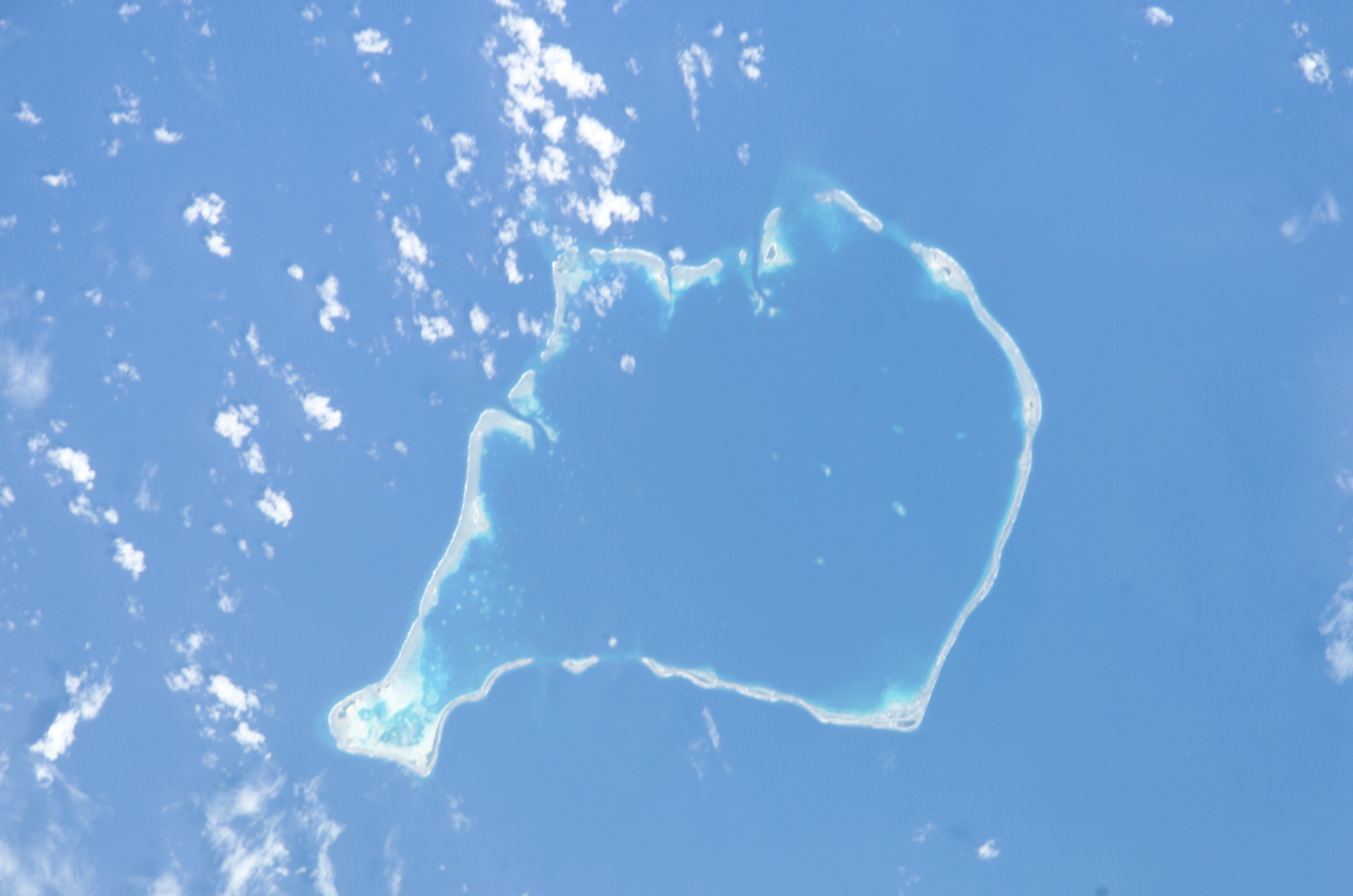
Funafuti (Tuvalu) from space

Funamanu is a small narrow island that is part of Funafuti, an atoll in Tuvalu. It is a motu (islet) or very small island 2.6 miles southwest of the southwest tip of Funafuti. The islet is covered in coconut trees which grow 70 feet high. Te Ava Pua Pua is the passage through the reef, with a least depth of 12.7 metres, between the islets of Funamanu to the north and Fale Fatu to the south, in the southeast of Funafuti atoll.

Funamanu is an example of an island on an atoll that is mainly composed of coral debris eroded from encircling reefs and pushed up onto the island by winds and waves. Paul Kench at the University of Auckland in New Zealand and Arthur Webb at the South Pacific Applied Geoscience Commission in Fiji released a study in 2010 on the dynamic response of reef islands to sea level rise in the central Pacific. Funamanu was mentioned in the study as being one of seven islands on the atolls of Tuvalu that have spread by more than 3 per cent on average since the 1950s. Funamanu gained 0.44 hectares, or nearly 30 per cent of its previous area.

The storm surge resulting from a tropical cyclone can dramatically shift coral debris. In 1972 Funafuti was in the path of Cyclone Bebe. Tropical Cyclone Bebe was a pre-season tropical cyclone that impacted the Gilbert, Ellice Islands, and Fiji island groups. First spotted on October 20, the system intensified and grew in size through October 22.
