= Donald Gilbert Kennedy =

British teacher and colonial official

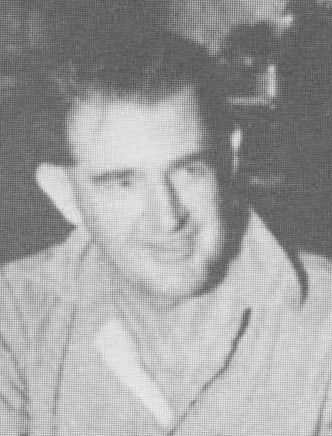
- Donald Kennedy in 1943
- Born: March 1898; Springhills, New Zealand
- Died: 1976; Bayly’s Beach, New Zealand
- Occupations: teacher, colonial administrator

Donald Gilbert Kennedy (March 1898 – 1976) was a teacher, then an administrator in the British colonial service in the Gilbert and Ellice Islands Colony and the British Solomon Islands Protectorate. For his services as a Coastwatcher during the Pacific War (World War II), he was awarded the DSO, and the Navy Cross (U.S.). (Note: Synopsis: The President of the United States takes pleasure in presenting the Navy Cross to Donald G. Kennedy, Captain, New Zealand, for extraordinary heroism in action against Japanese forces as a Coast Watcher at Sergi Point, New Georgia, in the Solomon Islands. Captain Kennedy he led his men in numerous skirmishes and destroyed or captured many Japanese troops, machine-guns, and barges, with negligible injury to his force. He also rescued many downed American airmen.) He published journal articles and books on the material culture of Vaitupu atoll, land tenure, and the language of the Ellice Islands.

== Childhood and education ==
Kennedy, the son of Robert and Isabelle Kennedy (née Chisholm), was born at Springhills near Invercargill. The family moved to Oamaru in 1904 and Kennedy attended local public schools: Tokarahi primary school (1904–1910) and Waitaki Boys' High School (1911–1915). He attended Kaikorai School in Dunedin where he gained a Teacher’s Certificate. He also completed the first part of an arts degree in French, Latin and History at Otago University, although he did not complete the degree. He served in the territorial army and in March 1918 he enlisted in the New Zealand army. When World War I ended in November 1918, he was a second lieutenant with his unit in training. He was a teacher at the Native College at Ōtaki (1919) and Dannevirke High School (1920). In December 1920, he married Nellie Chapman; they divorced in 1944.

== Service in the Gilbert and Ellice Islands Colony ==
In 1921, Kennedy became assistant master at the Suva Boys’ Grammar School in Fiji. He accepted a position with the Western Pacific High Commission (WPHC) and was appointed the headmaster to the Banaban School on Ocean Island in the Gilbert and Ellice Islands Colony. In 1923, he went to the Ellice Islands to found and direct a new school called Elisefou (New Ellice) on Funafuti, which he moved to Vaitupu the next year as the food supply was better on that atoll. He was the headmaster for 8 years and was a disciplinarian who would not hesitate to beat his students. The two most famous Tuvaluans from the school were Tuvalu's first Governor General, Sir Fiatau Penitala Teo and its first Prime Minister, Toaripi Lauti. In 1925–26 he built himself a radio transmitter, which he used to send messages to New Zealand. He also taught students how to build and operate radio transmitters.

In 1926, he was instrumental in establishing the first co-operative store (fusi) on Vaitupu, which became a model for the bulk purchasing and selling cooperative stores established in the Gilbert and Ellice Islands Colony to replace the stores operated by Palangi traders.

In 1929, Kennedy donated a large quantity of Tuvaluan artefacts to the Otago Museum. He published Field Notes on the Culture of Vaitupu, Ellice Islands in the Journal of the Polynesian Society in instalments between 1929 and 1932 and as a book in 1931.

In April 1932 Kennedy became the resident District Officer at Funafuti in the administration of the Gilbert and Ellice Islands Colony. He also served as the Native Lands Commissioner from 1934 to 1938. In 1938 he was awarded a Carnegie Travelling Scholarship to study for a year at University College, Oxford for a Diploma in Anthropology. Kennedy’s plans to return to Funafuti was ended by a deputation of islanders to the WPHC Commissioner, Sir Harry Luke, who provided a list of grievances about Kennedy’s drunkenness, cruelty and “always [being] after the native women and girls.” However, this deputation does not appear to represent the commonly held opinion of the Ellice Islanders, as a second deputation asked for Kennedy to return to the islands to complete his work as Land Commissioner and because the Islanders were grateful for Kennedy's work including in educating the Islanders at Elisefou school. An investigation of the complains after World War II concluded that the allegations were ‘vague in the extreme’ and that, without a proper enquiry, including giving Kennedy the opportunity to respond to the allegations, no judgment could be formed about his culpability. In August 1939, the WPHC appointed Kennedy to an administrative position on Ocean Island.

== Service in the British Solomon Islands Protectorate in World War II ==
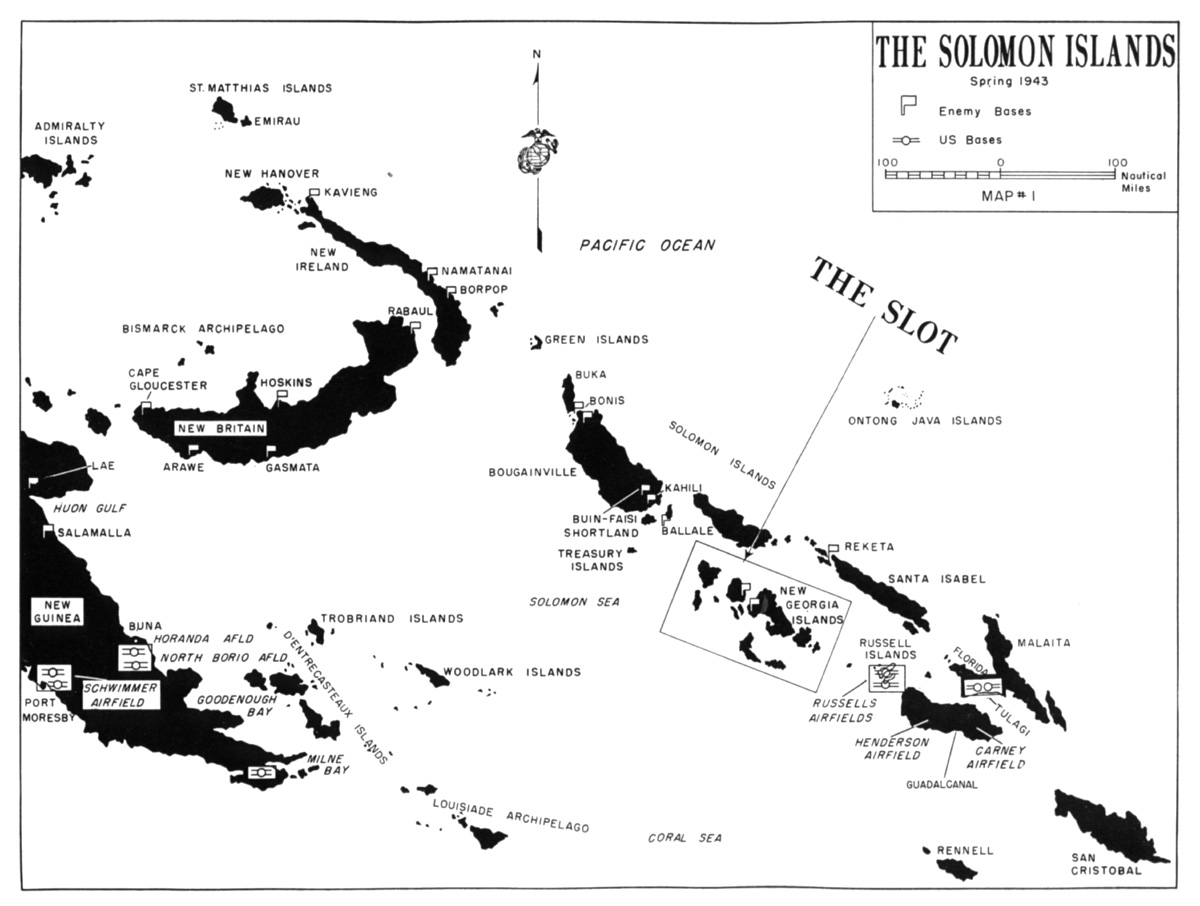
The Solomon Islands with the New Georgias highlighted

In 1940 he transferred to the British Solomon Islands Protectorate (BSIP) to work at the protectorate headquarters on Tulagi. He was allocated the administration of the district of Gela in the Nggela Islands. Following the attack of the Japanese on Pearl Harbor on 7 December 1941, he was commissioned as a captain in the BSIP Defence Force. He continued in his administrative duties, with his responsibilities covering the north-western half of the Solomon Islands and included Ysabel, Nggela and the Shortland Islands.

He organised an intelligence-gathering network of local informants and messengers to carry out the role of Coastwatchers; who were planters, government officials, missionaries and islanders who went into hiding after the Japanese invasion of the Solomon Islands in 1942. The Coastwatchers monitored Japanese shipping and aircraft (reporting by radio) and also rescued Allied personnel who were stranded in the territory held by the Japanese.

On 20 April 1942, Kennedy established a base at Mahanga (Mahaga), which overlooked Thousand Ships Bay on the south coast of Santa Isabel Island. Following further Japanese advances, in July 1942 he transferred his headquarters to Seghe (Segi or Sergi) on the south coast of New Georgia, which was on the channel between New Georgia and Vangunu in the Western Province. On 7 August 1942, U.S. forces captured Tulagi and an airfield on Guadalcanal. As Seghe was under the flight path of the Japanese aircraft flying from Rabaul, Kennedy was able to provide warnings by radio to the U.S. forces of attacking aircraft. Kennedy reported on Japanese shipping in the New Georgia Sound (known as ‘The Slot’), which were attempting to reinforce the troops on Guadalcanal, and also rescued downed American airmen.

Kennedy lead a force of about 30 Solomon Islander fighters, with about 60 carriers of equipment. Kennedy gained a reputation for physical abuse of his subordinates and islanders that he viewed as defying his authority.

By March 1943 the U.S. command were planning the New Georgia Campaign, which included an assault on the Japanese airfield at Munda, in the north-west of New Georgia and also landing at Seghe to build an airfield. Kennedy directed engagements when Japanese patrols were in the vicinity of Seghe. During the night of 19 May 1943 Kennedy and his crew on the 10-ton schooner Dadavata engaged a Japanese patrol in a 25-foot long Japanese Whaleboat on the Marovo Lagoon. During the firefight, Kennedy received a wound to his right thigh. At the time the wound was attributed to a bullet fired by the Japanese, however following a confession in 1987, it appears that the bullet was fired by Kennedy’s own lieutenant, Bill Bennett, who had recently been flogged by Kennedy. Two companies of the 4th Marine Raider Battalion landed at Seghe on the morning of 21 June to defend it against an attack launched by a Japanese battalion. He ended his war service with the rank of major.

== 1944–46 Resettlement of Banabans on Rabi Island, Fiji ==
In February 1944, he was appointed as acting district commissioner, based in the new capital of the BSIP in Honiara on Guadalcanal. In July 1944 he returned to New Zealand and divorced Nellie then married Mary Campbell. In December 1944, after receiving hospital treatment for alcoholism, he was appointed by the WPHC to an administration position in Fiji.

In August 1945, he was appointed as the ‘Banaban adviser’ to draw up a constitution for the ‘council and the management of a cooperative society’ for the Banaban people of Ocean Island, whom the colonial administration were resettling on Rabi Island in Fiji. The Banabans had been deported by the Japanese to Nauru, Tarawa and Kosrae. They were unwilling migrants to Fiji, and they were angry because the British Phosphate Commission had made Ocean Island uninhabitable. Kennedy was forced to call on the police when the Banabans began protesting. Kennedy was subsequently replaced as the Banaban adviser in May 1946.

== Activities 1947 to 1950 ==
Following vacation leave he retired as ‘District Officer, BSIP’ on 25 April 1947. He and Mary went to live on ‘Glen Aros’ station in Hawke’s Bay, New Zealand, which Mary had inherited from her parents. He continued to suffer from alcoholism.

He was employed by ASIO for 7 months in 1950. He spent three months of that time in Lae in Papua New Guinea (PNG) before resigning. Kennedy was involved in the establishment of a branch of the Australian Security Service in PNG, which appears to be motivated by a fear of Communist infiltration.

== 1951–52 Resettlement of Vaitupuans on Kioa Island, Fiji ==
In 1945, Kennedy visited Vaitupu, where overpopulation was an issue, and some of the islanders were receptive to resettlement. Kennedy encouraged Neli Lifuka in the resettlement proposal that eventually resulted in the purchase of Kioa island in Fiji.

In June 1946, Kennedy and Henry Evans Maude, bought the island of Kioa in Fiji on behalf of the Vaitupuans who wanted to migrate. Between 1947 and 1963, 217 people moved to Kioa. Kennedy was invited to Kioa to act as an advisor to the community. He arrived on Kioa in September 1951 and initiated an ambitious development program involving clearing bush, planting coconuts and grazing cattle in order to create an enterprise that could attract further Ellice Islanders to live on Kioa. This program was not accepted by the settlers and the following year they expelled him from the island.

== Retirement 1952 to 1976 ==
He purchased the small island of Waya, in the Kadavu Group, Fiji in 1952. He and Mary were divorced in the same year.

In 1958 Emeline, an Ellice Islander, became his common-law wife. In 1973 Kennedy’s health declined; as a consequence he sold the island, after marrying, he and Emeline retired to New Zealand. He died in 1976, aged 77 yrs.

== Publications ==
- Kennedy, Donald Gilbert, Field notes on the culture of Vaitupu, Ellice Islands’ (1931): Thomas Avery & Sons, New Plymouth, N.Z.
- Kennedy, Donald Gilbert, ‘Te ngangana a te Tuvalu – Handbook on the language of the Ellice Islands’ (1946) Websdale, Shoosmith, Sydney N.S.W.
- Kennedy, Donald Gilbert (1953). "Land tenure in the Ellice Islands by Donald Gilbert Kennedy". Journal of the Polynesian Society. 62: 348–358.
- Kennedy, Donald Gilbert (1931). The Ellice Islands Canoe Journal of the Polynesian Society Memoir no. 9. Journal of the Polynesian Society. pp. 71–100. Archived from the original on 6 October 2022.

== Sources ==
- Butcher, Mike (2012). ... when the long trick's over': Donald Kennedy in the Pacific. Kennington, Vic., Australia: Holland House. ISBN 9780987162700.
- Feldt, Eric Augustus (1991) [1946]. The Coastwatchers. Victoria, Australia: Penguin Books. ISBN 0-14-014926-0.
- Lord, Walter (2006) [1977]. Lonely Vigil; Coastwatchers of the Solomons. New York: Naval Institute Press. ISBN 1-59114-466-3.

== Notes ==
Footnotes

Citations
