= Neli Lifuka =

- Born: 1909; Vaitupu, Tuvalu, (Then known as the Ellice Islands)
- Died: 1980; Kioa, Fiji
- Occupation: Marine engineer & magistrate

Neli Lifuka was born in 1909 on Vaitupu, he worked as a marine engineer and from 1945 to 1951 he was the magistrate on Vaitupu. He organised the collection of the funds necessary to purchase Kioa island in Fiji in 1946 and in 1956 he joined the Kioa community and became the chairman of the council.

== Early life ==
Neli Lifuka was educated at Elisefou school, which were turbulent years as he was in conflict with Donald Gilbert Kennedy, the headmaster.

He gained employment on freighters and on the phosphate boats that worked at Banaba Island (Ocean Island). He was promoted to be an engineer. He also work on a government boat and a missionary vessel; with each of these jobs he resigned after arguing with his commanding officers over pay and conditions.

Kennedy, who in 1932 became the resident District Officer at Funafuti for the Gilbert and Ellice Islands Colony, gave him work blasting reef passages. He was given a job on Ocean Island as a hospital dresser and as the Ellice community liaison person. He ended up leading a strike of Ellice Island workers against the British Phosphate Commission.

== World War II ==
During the Pacific War Neli Lifuka was on Vaitupu working as a Coastwatcher to identify any Japanese activity.

He was later engaged in organising Tuvaluans to work at Funafuti on building the American base and unloading ships.

We had to unload the cargo from the ships. It was hard work but the Americans looked after us very well. The only trouble was with the British. They didn't want the Americans to give us the wages they wanted to pay. We got seven dollars and fifty cents a month, that is three pounds and fifteen shillings. I was the paymaster for all the natives because I knew about that. The American quartermaster told me about the trouble with the British. He showed me a paper which said that we should get 70 dollars a month. So he said that we should keep the money for us that was left over when I had paid the laborers but keep quiet about it. There was always more than I needed to pay the laborers.

== Post-War years ==
After World War II Kennedy encouraged Neli Lifuka in the resettlement proposal that resulted in the purchase of Kioa island in Fiji in 1946. Neli Lifuka organised the collection of the funds to purchase Kioa. Initially 37 people migrated from Vaitupu to live on Kioa Island; within a decade, more than 235 people followed.

In June 1945 Neli Lifuka was appointed the magistrate on Vaitupu. He alienated Colonial administrators for not strictly enforcing laws. He also alienated some of the elders because of his comparative young age to be person in authority in the Vaitupuan community. He resigned in 1951 after being caught in flagrante delicto with the pastor’s wife. Thereafter he worked for the Colony Cooperative Society and again worked on an inter-island vessel.

In 1956, he joined the Kioa community and became the chairman of its council.
