= Sarah Jolliffe =

English missionary in Tuvalu

- Occupation: Missionary
- Spouse(s): Harold Temple Wills

Sarah Elizabeth Jolliffe Wills (died 1942?) was the first white missionary in Tuvalu.

Sarah Jolliffe was the eldest daughter of Samuel Jolliffe of Northbourne, Kent. She was educated at Whitefield's College in Chelsea.

Jolliffe worked for the London Missionary Society in the South Pacific. She initially worked under missionaries in Samoa and in 1912 the LMS sent her to Funafuti to start a school for girls. Called Misi Olivé by her students, she taught 30-40 girls from all over Tuvalu. Her work ended in 1920 and she returned to England.

In 1926, she married the Rev. Harold Temple Wills, a missionary and grandson of Henry Overton Wills II.

Her diary and letters are held in the National Library of Australia collection of London Missionary Society documents.
