= Palagi =

Term in Samoan culture to describe foreigners

Palagi (pronounced [ˈpaːlaŋi], singular) or papalagi (plural) is a term in Samoan culture of uncertain etymology, sometimes used to describe foreigners.

In the Samoan language, the term is used to describe non-Samoans, usually white foreigners of European or American descent. It is both a noun (e.g. a palagi, or a European person) and an adjective (e.g. Palagi house, i.e. a non-traditional Samoan house). The word is a cognate in other Polynesian languages and has gained widespread use throughout much of western Polynesia, including in Tokelau, Tuvalu, Wallis and Futuna, and Fiji.

Written Pālagi or Papālagi in Samoan, and Papālangi or Pālangi in Tongan, the term Pālagi is also used in Niuean.

== Use, meaning and origin of term ==
The etymology of the term Palagi is disputed. An explanation that emerged in the 19th century is that word is derived from the Polynesian root words "pa" (meaning: gates) and "lagi" (meaning: sky or heaven), hence the standard translation "gates of heaven" It has been suggested that the compound word comes from the Polynesian's reaction to seeing for the first time, European missionaries enter the country. Their skin being a different color made them think they were men sent from the gates of heaven. Tcherkézoff (1999) argues that such an interpretation is a European projection to explain Polynesian cosmology. Tent and Geraghty (2001) comment that the origin of the Western Polynesian Papālagi~Pālagi and the Fijian Vāvālagi~Pāpālagi remains a matter of speculation.

Jan Tent, a Macquarie University linguist, and Dr. Paul Geraghty, former director of the Institute of Fijian Language and Culture in Suva, suggest that the word may have its origins in the travels of the Polynesians themselves. They believe that the Polynesian islanders may have encountered Malay travellers prior to contact with Europeans, and adopted the Malay word barang (meaning: imported cloth). These researchers also suggest another possible etymology – the Malay word for European, as used in the 17th and 18th centuries, was faranggi. However, they discount this possibility as the word palangi seems to have originally referred to cloth; only later was the word transferred to the people. Another suggestion is that the word papalangi may be a Tongan adaptation of the Dutch word blank. Blank is used in Dutch to describe people of Caucasian descent. In the 17th century authors like Nicolaes Witsen or Arnoldus Montanus used the word to distinguish Europeans from people of colour. The word may have been introduced to Tonga by Abel Tasman in 1643. Tasman’s journal does not use the term blank but frequently refers to the skin colour of indigenous people. It seems a realistic scenario that the difference in skin colour between Tongans and Dutch came up in conversations and Tongans heard and adapted the word blank.

== Recorded use ==
Captain Cook noted the expression "ko e vaka no papalangi" (the boats of Papalangi) in Tonga, with Cook's transcription being "Towacka no papalangie" and his translation as "cloth ships".

The specific origin of this term remains uncertain. The term has gained widespread use throughout much of western Polynesia including Tokelau, Tuvalu, 'Uvea and Futuna, etc., with the expansion of use of the term being though to have occurred in the 18th century when Tongans, and to lesser extent Samoans, regularly interacted with white sailors, beachcombers, convicts, missionaries, and whalers who clearly delineated ethnoracial boundaries between themselves (papalagi/papalangi) and the Polynesians they encountered.

The missionary John Williams, of the London Missionary Society, records a speech in Samoa, in 1830, referring to the great powers of the "papalangis".

Louis Becke after having worked and travelled in the Pacific from 1869 to 1885 uses papalagi to mean a white person in stories set in what is now Tuvalu, The Rangers of the Tia Kua, Kennedy the Boatsteerer in which appears "The last native girl who occupied the proud position of Te avaga te papalagi (the white man's wife) was a native of the island of Maraki"; Samoa, A Basket of Bread-Fruit, At a Kava-Drinking in which appears "alii papalagi (white gentleman)" and "this wandering papalagi tafea (beachcomber)", The Best Asset in a Fool’s Estate in which appears "the papalagi mativa (poor white)”; and the Tokelau, Challis the Doubter.

== Modern usage ==
Largely because of the growing Pacific Islander culture in New Zealand, this word has been adopted by other Pacific cultures. Its usage in New Zealand's Pacific Islander media such as television and radio is common, and it is often used by the mainstream media to describe non-Samoans of European descent.

The term is now also used in New Zealand in a similar way to the Māori term Pākehā, but it is not restricted in referring to white people within Pacific-island surroundings. As with Pākehā, Samoans and Tongans initially applied palagi/palangi and papalagi/papalangi to whites of British derivation. Today, the Samoan term "gagana fa'a Palagi", the Tongan term "lea fakapālangi" and the Tuvaluan term "faka-Pālagi" still refer to the English language specifically, even though it is understood that many ethnic Europeans who are considered "palagi" do not speak English but rather German, French, Spanish, etc. While the term is generally applied to people of European ancestry as a means of differentiation or categorization, some feel the term is derogatory, especially when aimed pointedly toward half-caste Samoans or ethnic Samoans who were born and raised in western, metropolitan societies; "fia palagi" and "fie palangi" are commonly applied to ethnic Samoans and Tongans, respectively, who are viewed as favoring the "white man's" lifestyle or culture in lieu of traditional Polynesian modes of speech, dress, housing, interpersonal relations, etc.

Tcherkezoff (1999) comments, "Europeans are still called Papālagi in today's languages. In Samoan, it is an absolutely common everyday word, not in any way a metaphoric ceremonial expression used for special circumstances or used in derogatory/laudatory ways."

== See also ==
- Europeans in Oceania
- Haole, the equivalent Hawaiian term
- Pākehā, the equivalent term in the Māori language
