= Kioa =

- Island
- Location in Fiji
- Coordinates: 16°39′S 179°55′E
- Country: Fiji
- Island group: Vanua Levu Group
- Province: Cakaudrove
- Tikina: Cakaudrove

Kioa is an island in Fiji, an outlier to Vanua Levu, one of Fiji's two main islands. Situated opposite Buca Bay, Kioa was purchased by settlers from Vaitupu atoll in Tuvalu, who came between 1947 and 1962.

Despite its relatively large size, Vaitupu became so overcrowded during the 1940s that a number of families migrated to live on Kioa Island. At the end of World War II, Neli Lifuka was instrumental in collecting the funds to purchase Kioa.

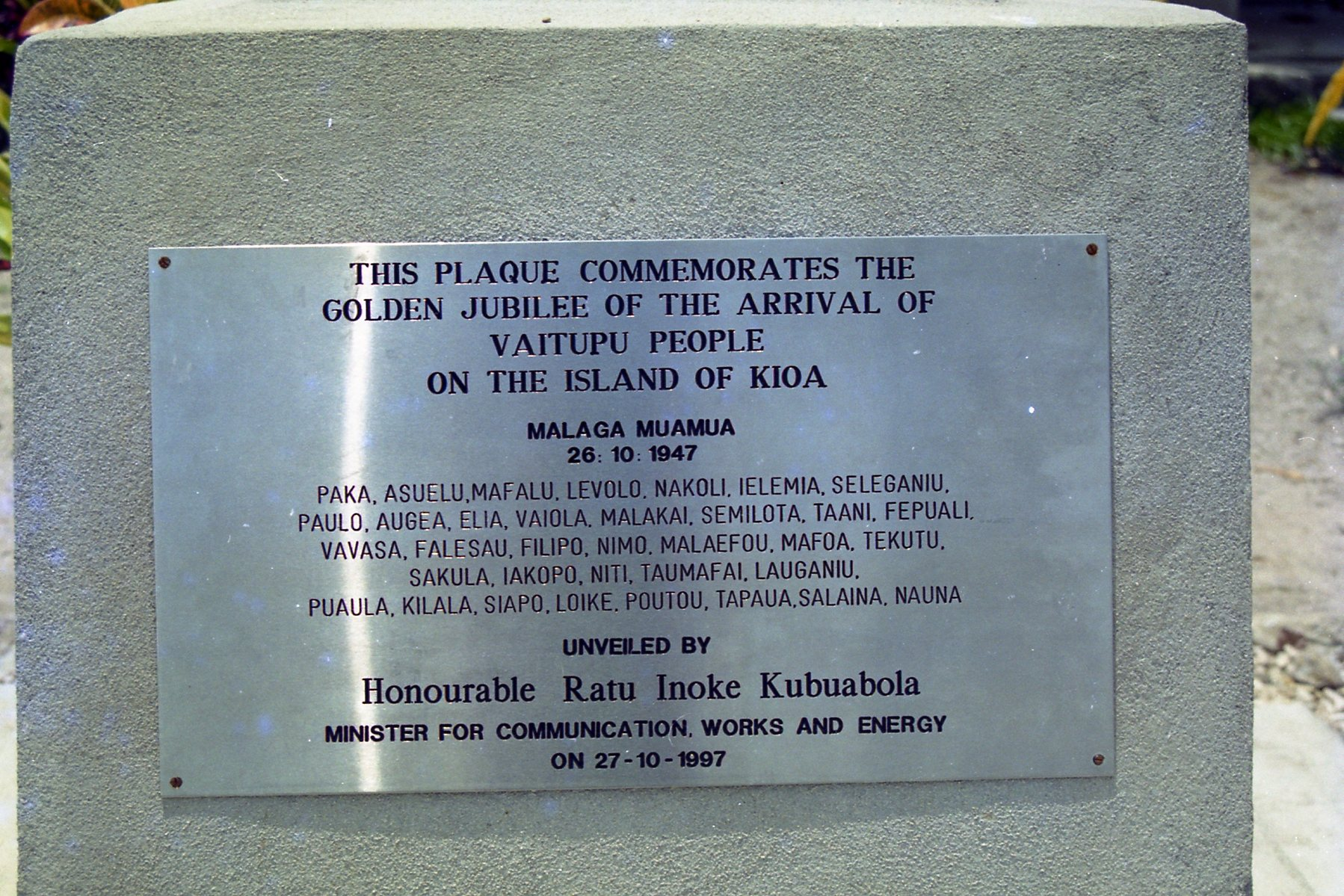
Memorial to the arrival of the first settlers.

Initially 37 people migrated from Vaitupu to live on Kioa Island; within a decade, more than 235 people followed. In 1956, Neli Lifuka joined the Kioa community and became the chairman of its council.

Kioa is one of two islands in Fiji populated by migrant communities from the Pacific Islands, the other being Rabi, also in the Vanua Levu Group and home to a displaced Banaban community. Early in 2005, the Fijian government decided to grant full citizenship to the Kioa and Rabi Islanders. As a culmination of a decade-long quest for naturalization, a formal ceremony was held on 15 December 2005 to award 566 citizenship certificates to residents of the islands and their descendants (some of whom now live elsewhere in Fiji), which entitles them to provincial and national assistance for rural development. The ceremony was led by Cabinet Ministers Josefa Vosanibola and Ratu Naiqama Lalabalavu, who is also the Tui Cakau, or Paramount Chief of Cakaudrove, which includes the island of Kioa.

Lalabalavu called on the Kioa islanders to be proud of their identity and to nurture and protect their culture.

Although part of Cakaudrove Province, the island has a degree of autonomy with its own administrative body, the Kioa Island Council, although the Fijian Cabinet decided on 15 January 2006 to merge it with the Rabi Island Council.

The island environment contributes to its national significance as outlined in Fiji's Biodiversity Strategy and Action Plan.

== Population transfer proposal ==
In February 2006, at a climate refugee forum in Melbourne, Don Kennedy, a retired Tuvalu-born Australian scientist, suggested the entire population of Tuvalu should move to the island, to preserve Tuvaluan culture as their homeland becomes uninhabitable due to rising sea levels. "A mass relocation would ensure the Tuvaluan language and culture is preserved instead of being scattered to the four corners of the earth," the Fiji Live news service quoted him as saying. Tuvalu's nine islands stand an average height of just 3 meters above sea level.

Fiji's political parties were cautious in their response to Kennedy's proposal. United Peoples Party President Mick Beddoes said that moving the 9000 Tuvaluans would put a great strain on Kioa's resources and economy. He said that Pacific Island nations should share the cost of such a move, with most of the finance coming from "the major polluting nations." National Alliance Party President Ratu Epeli Ganilau (who hails from the neighbouring island of Taveuni) said that the proper procedures would have to be followed, while National Federation Party President Raman Pratap Singh said that the proposal was a good one in principle, but that proper arrangements would have to be made, and compensation would have to be paid to the landowners.

Tuvalu's prime minister Maatia Toafa said on 21 February 2006 that relocation to Kioa was under consideration, but was not a priority. Buying land in Australia or New Zealand was also an option, he said. If they were to move to Kioa, they would need finance to develop the island, Fiji Live quoted him as saying.

In 2013 Enele Sopoaga, the prime minister of Tuvalu, said that relocating Tuvaluans to avoid the impact of sea level rise “should never be an option because it is self defeating in itself. For Tuvalu I think we really need to mobilise public opinion in the Pacific as well as in the [rest of] world to really talk to their lawmakers to please have some sort of moral obligation and things like that to do the right thing.”

== Prominent local people ==
Asenate Manoa was born on 23 May 1992 in Kioa and is a Tuvaluan track and field athlete who represented Tuvalu at the 2008 Summer Olympics, at the 2009 World Championships & 2011 World Championships and at the 2012 Summer Olympics. Karalo Maibuca Junior, born 1999 in Nanumaga, but from Kioa mother and living in Kioa, is also a Tuvaluan track and field athlete who represented Tuvalu at the 2020 Summer Olympics.
