= Cyclone Pam =

2015 South Pacific cyclone

Severe Tropical Cyclone Pam
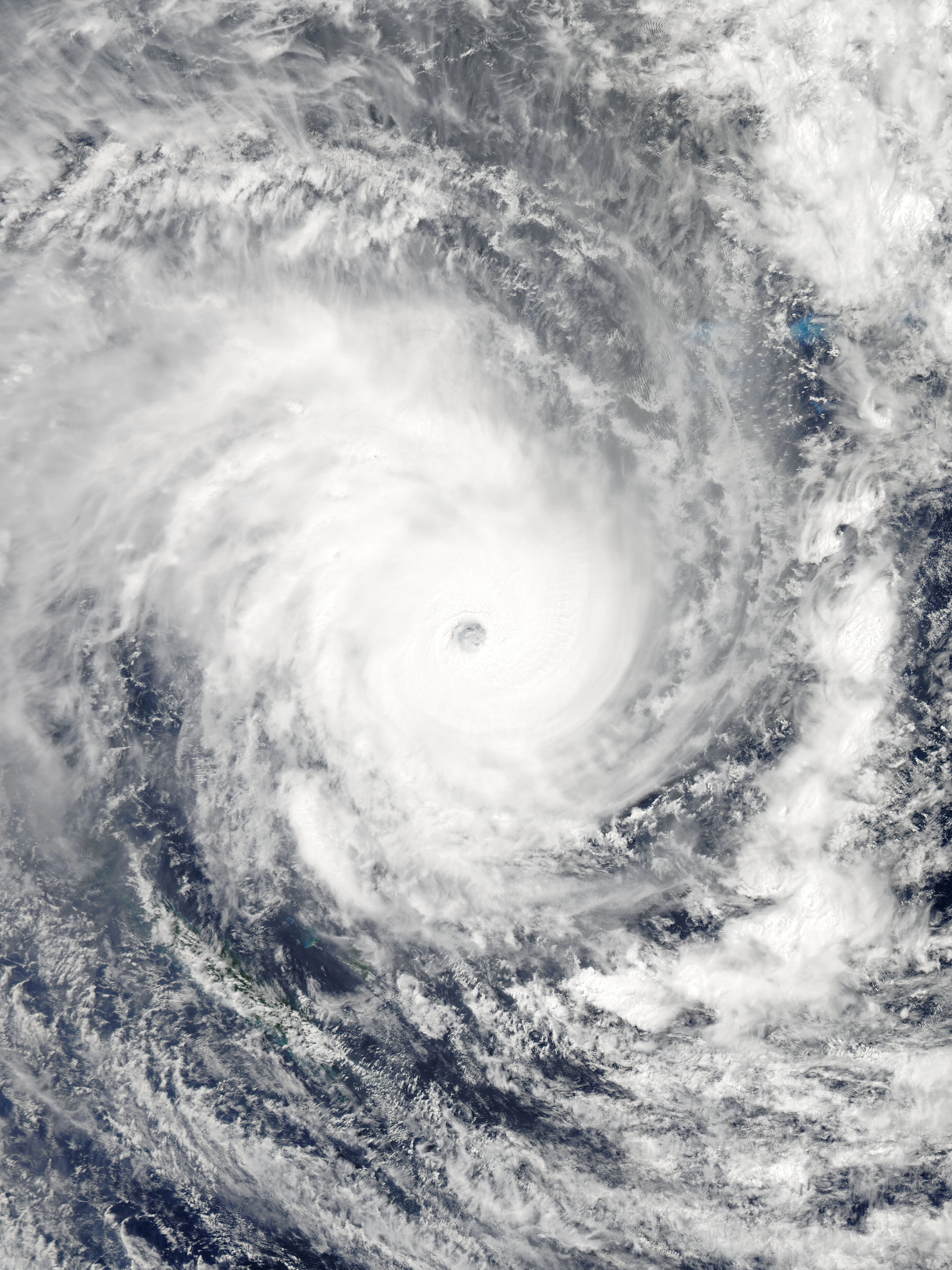
- Cyclone Pam near peak intensity while over Vanuatu on 13 March

Meteorological history
- Formed: 6 March 2015
- Extratropical: 15 March 2015
- Dissipated: 20 March 2015

Category 5 severe tropical cyclone
- 10-minute sustained (FMS)
- Highest winds: 250 km/h (155 mph)
- Lowest pressure: 896 hPa (mbar); 26.46 inHg (Fourth-lowest in the Southern Hemisphere)

Category 5-equivalent tropical cyclone
- 1-minute sustained (SSHWS/JTWC)
- Highest winds: 280 km/h (175 mph)
- Lowest pressure: 911 hPa (mbar); 26.90 inHg

Overall effects
- Fatalities: 15–16 total
- Damage: $543 million (2015 USD)
- Areas affected: Fiji, Kiribati, Solomon Islands, Tuvalu, Vanuatu, New Caledonia, New Zealand
- IBTrACS
- Part of the 2014–15 South Pacific cyclone season

Severe Tropical Cyclone Pam was the second most intense tropical cyclone of the South Pacific Ocean in terms of sustained winds and is regarded as one of the worst natural disasters in the history of Vanuatu. A total of 15–16 people died either directly or indirectly as a result of Pam with many others injured. The storm's impacts were also felt, albeit to a lesser extent, on other islands in the South Pacific, most notably the Solomon Islands, Tuvalu, and New Zealand. Pam is the third most intense storm of the South Pacific Ocean according to pressure, after Winston of 2016 and Zoe of 2002. It is also the second most intense tropical cyclone in 2015, only behind Hurricane Patricia. In addition, Pam is tied with Orson, Monica, Marcus and Fantala for having the second strongest ten-minute maximum sustained winds in the Southern Hemisphere. Thousands of homes, schools and buildings were damaged or destroyed, with an estimated 3,300 people displaced as a result.

Pam formed on 6 March, east of the Solomon Islands and tracked slowly in a generally southward direction, slowly intensifying as it did so. Two days later, the disturbance reached tropical cyclone intensity and, over subsequent days, Pam gradually strengthened before reaching Category 5 cyclone status on both the Australian and Saffir–Simpson scales on 12 March. The next day, Pam's sustained winds peaked at 250 km/h (155 mph) as the storm moved through Vanuatu, passing near several constituent islands and making direct hits on others. On 14 March, Pam's winds began to slowly weaken, but its pressure dropped further to a minimum of 896 mbar (hPa; 26.46 inHg) before rising shortly afterwards. Over the next few days, the cyclone's weakening accelerated as it moved poleward. On 15 March, Pam passed northeast of New Zealand before transitioning into an extratropical cyclone that same day.

Early in Pam's history, a damaging storm surge impacted Tuvalu, prompting a state of emergency declaration after 45 percent of the nation's residents were displaced. Torrential rainfall occurred in the southeastern Solomon Islands, particularly in the Santa Cruz Islands. In Vanuatu, all emergency centres were activated and relief personnel were put on standby with Pam assessed as having the potential to be one of the nation's worst tropical cyclones. Catastrophic damage occurred as the storm moved through the archipelago, particularly in Efate, the location of the Ni-Vanuatu capital of Port Vila; and the Tafea islands of Erromango and Tanna. The cyclone crippled Vanuatu's infrastructure: an estimated 90 percent of the nation's buildings were impacted by the storm's effects, telecommunications were paralysed, and water shortages continue to plague the small nation. Pam later brought heavy winds and rough surf to New Zealand's North Island during its weakening stages.

== Meteorological history ==
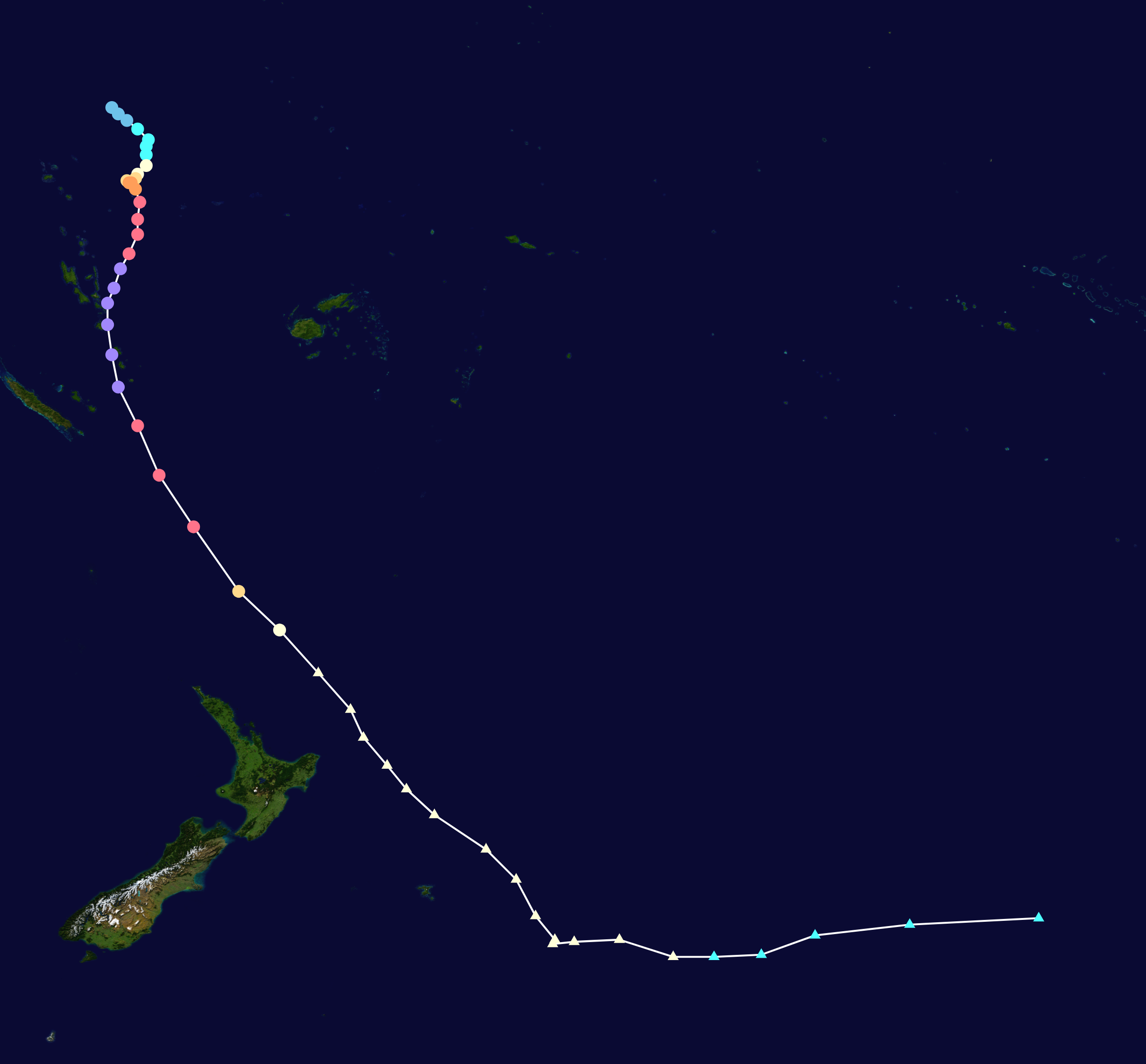
Map plotting the storm's track and intensity, according to the Saffir–Simpson scale Map key Saffir–Simpson scale Tropical depression (≤38 mph, ≤62 km/h) Tropical storm (39–73 mph, 63–118 km/h) Category 1 (74–95 mph, 119–153 km/h) Category 2 (96–110 mph, 154–177 km/h) Category 3 (111–129 mph, 178–208 km/h) Category 4 (130–156 mph, 209–251 km/h) Category 5 (≥157 mph, ≥252 km/h) Unknown Storm type Tropical cyclone Subtropical cyclone Extratropical cyclone, remnant low, tropical disturbance, or monsoon depression

During the opening days of March 2015, a major westerly wind burst occurred, which subsequently contributed to the development of the 2014–16 El Niño event and the development of two tropical cyclones near Kiribati on either side of the equator. The first tropical cyclone became Tropical Storm Bavi and impacted the Marshall Islands, the Mariana Islands and Philippines. The second system was first noted as Tropical Disturbance 11F by the Fiji Meteorological Service (FMS) on 6 March, while it was located about 750 kilometres (465 mi) to the north-east of Honiara in the Solomon Islands. The system was located underneath an upper-level ridge of high pressure and within an area favourable for further development with low-moderate vertical windshear. As a result, weather forecast models anticipated the development of a significant tropical cyclone over the coming days. Initially, the disturbance floundered east of the Solomon Islands and slowly strengthened, reaching tropical depression intensity on 8 March. The storm's appearance and areal coverage of showers remained stationary until the following day, when the formation of rainbands wrapping around the centre of the system prompted the FMS to upgrade the storm's classification to a category 1 tropical cyclone on the Australian tropical cyclone scale, assigning it the name Pam. Atmospheric conditions at the time were slightly favourable for continued development as the storm continued to slowly track along the southern periphery of a high-pressure area to its north.

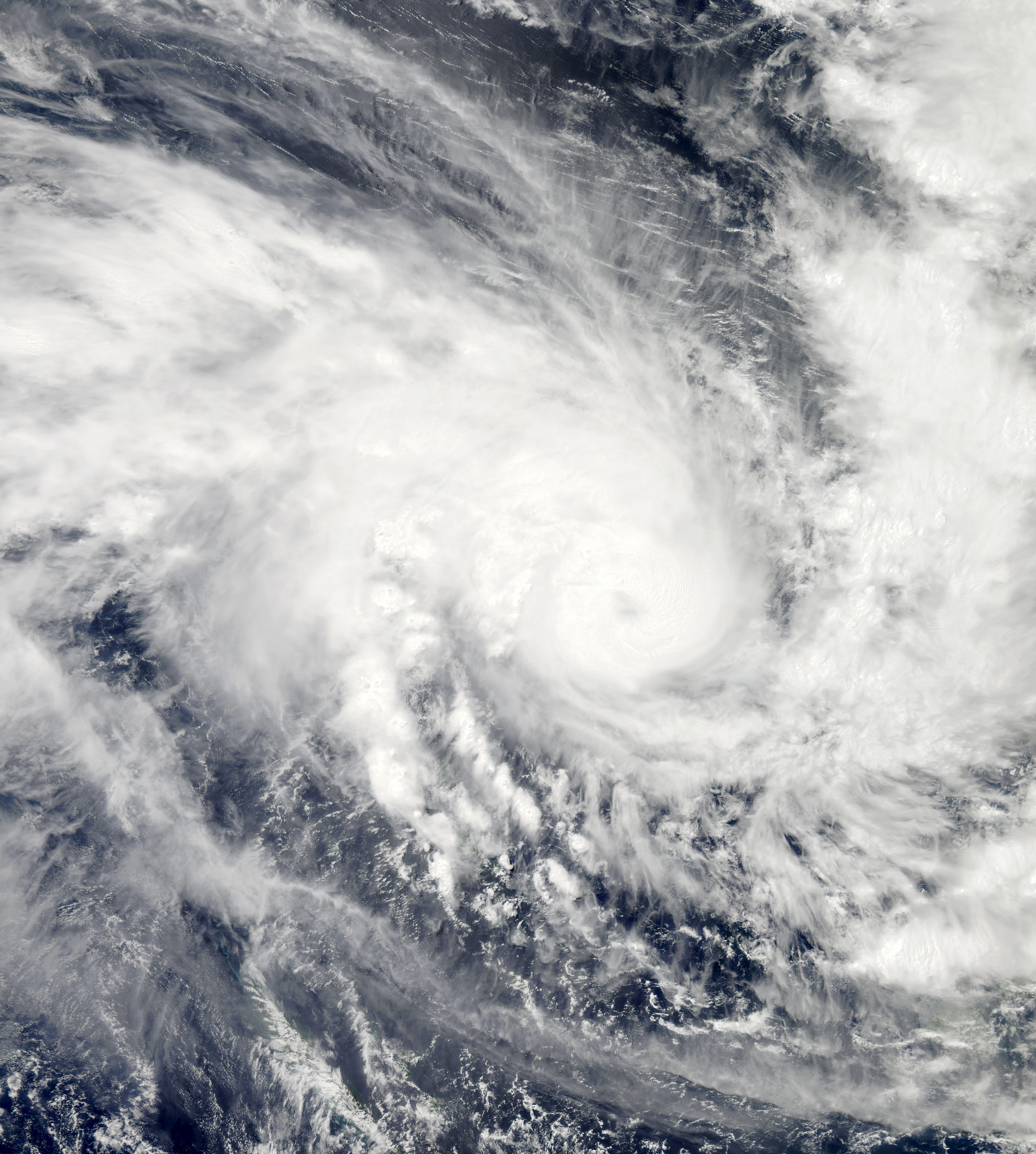
Severe Tropical Cyclone Pam strengthening off the island of Espiritu Santo, Vanuatu on 11 March

Following the storm's naming, Pam began to curve southwards around midday on 9 March. Computer models continued to point towards the possibility of rapid intensification occurring as the cyclone approached Vanuatu. Significant development in Pam's organisation took place throughout the remainder of the day into 10 March. The cyclone's circulation centre quickly tightened, with the central dense overcast atop it persisting in strength. At 18:00 UTC on 10 March, the FMS upgraded the system to category 3 strength, making it a severe tropical cyclone. Shortly after, microwave imagery revealed a primordial eye-feature developing within Pam. This became apparent on visible light images on 11 March. That day, Pam became quasi-stationary east of the Santa Cruz Islands before resuming its prior southwesterly motion towards the end of 11 March. The storm's eye continued to warm as its cloud tops cooled such that at 12:00 UTC, the FMS assessed Pam to have reached Category 5 intensity on the Australian cyclone scale. Six hours later, the JTWC estimated that the storm reached Category 5-equivalent intensity on the Saffir–Simpson hurricane wind scale as Pam was east of Penama.

Early on 13 March, the JTWC determined Pam reached its peak one-minute sustained winds of 270 km/h (170 mph) as it neared Vanuatu; this was increased to 280 km/h (175 mph) in post-season reanalysis. Several hours later, the cyclone began to curve towards the south-southeast, allowing Pam to pass just east of Efate. At that time, the FMS estimated Pam as having record-breaking 250 km/h (155 mph) ten-minute sustained winds. The storm's winds gradually slowed afterwards as Pam tracked west of Tafea. However, the FMS indicated that the cyclone's pressure dropped further to a minimum of 896 mbar (hPa; 26.46 inHg) on 14 March, making Pam the second most intense tropical cyclone in the South Pacific basin after Cyclone Zoe in 2002. This intensity was short-lived, however, as Pam's central pressure began rising shortly thereafter as the storm accelerated southeastward. After 12:00 UTC that day, Pam left the area of responsibility of the FMS and entered the monitoring region of New Zealand's MetService, who estimated that Pam weakened to Category 4 intensity on 15 March after maintaining Category 5 intensity for 36 hours. Shortly after, the storm's eye faded away and Pam's low level circulation became displaced from its associated thunderstorms, signalling a rapid weakening phase. Later on 15 March, both agencies discontinued issuing advisories as Pam entered a phase of extratropical transition while affecting northeastern New Zealand. The system moved eastwards, and eventually dissipated over the waters of the South Pacific on 20 March.

== Effects ==
Severe Tropical Cyclone Pam was responsible for 24 deaths as it impacted various parts of the Pacific Ocean, before the name was retired from the South Pacific lists of tropical cyclone names. The system also influenced the Pacific trade winds and with Tropical Storm Bavi, caused one of the strongest trade wind reversals that had been observed on record.

=== Kiribati ===
Bavi and Pam caused severe weather including swells, heavy rain and strong winds to be reported within Kiribati between 8–11 March. Significant damage occurred in Tarawa due to swells, including to major causeways and strong winds struck outlying atolls.

=== Vanuatu ===
After all the development we have done for the last couple of years and this big cyclone came and just destroyed... all the infrastructure the government has... built. Completely destroyed.

— Vanuatu President Baldwin Lonsdale,

Pam hitting Vanuatu on 13 March 2015

By 12 March, the National Disaster Management Office in Vanuatu activated all emergency operation centres in the country. Officials reported difficulty in contacting outlying islands where there was poor infrastructure. In those areas, they advised residents to identify nearby shelters in case evacuation was necessary. Across the country, residents spent the day on 12 March stocking up on supplies for the storm. The International Federation of Red Cross and Red Crescent Societies stated volunteers were on standby for assessments in Fiji, the Solomon Islands, and Vanuatu once the storm passed. Supplies of water and water purification systems were pre-positioned for the countries. Acting director of the Vanuatu National Disaster Management Office, Peter Korisa, warned that should Pam strike the capital of Port Vila it could be worse than Cyclone Uma in 1987 which killed 50 people and caused US$150 million in damage.

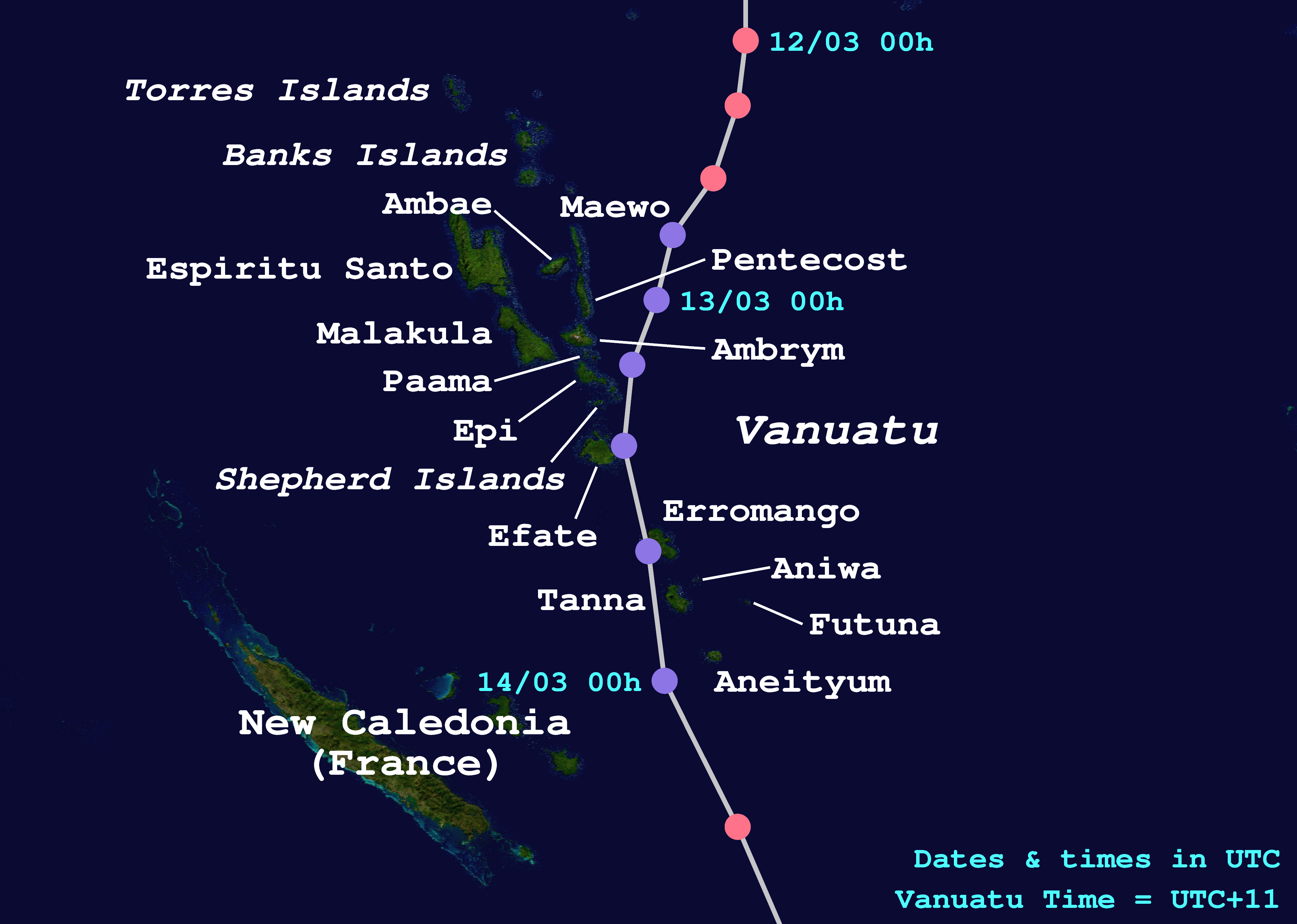
Enlarged track of Cyclone Pam between 12 and 14 March depicting its path in relation to the islands of Vanuatu

The death toll from Cyclone Pam is uncertain, with totals from the Vanuatu Government and United Nations differing. According to Vanuatu, 11 people died as a direct result of Pam. Four others died at Vila Central Hospital shortly after the storm's passage, though these are considered indirectly related. According to the United Nations, a total of 16 people were killed. In the immediate aftermath, media outlets indicated unconfirmed reports of 44 casualties in the many villages destroyed by the storm; however, these claims were never substantiated.

According to UNICEF, at least 132,000 people have been impacted by Tropical Cyclone Pam, of whom 54,000 are children. Communication across the country was crippled, with only one cellular tower in Port Vila remaining operational. The power grid was devastated as well and officials estimated repairs could take weeks. Four days after the storm, nearly 60 of the nation's inhabited islands remained cut-off from the outside world. UNICEF has estimated that up to 90 percent of the buildings in Vanuatu have been affected by Tropical Cyclone Pam. Hospitals, schools and water supply are either compromised or destroyed. Journalist Michael McLennan in Port Vila likened the effects of Pam to a bomb: "It's like a bomb has gone through...It's really quite apocalyptic." Sune Gudnitz, head of the United Nations Office for the Coordination of Humanitarian Affairs (OCHA), stated that Pam was indeed a worst-case scenario for Vanuatu.

Deaths by island in Vanuatu
Island	Fatalities	Ref.
Efate	7	
Lelepa	1	
Mataso	2	
Tanna	5	
Unknown	0–1	
Total	15–16	
Fatalities include indirect deaths also

Catastrophic damage occurred on the islands of Erromango and Tanna. Communication with the islands was completely severed during the storm, and first contact with residents did not take place until two days after Pam's passage. A pilot who flew to the islands reported that all infrastructure had been crippled, with every structure severely damaged or destroyed. Concrete buildings held up during the storm, but lost their roofs. Locals reported two fatalities on Tanna, though this was unconfirmed by officials. Additionally, there was no drinkable water left on the island. Approximately 95 percent of the homes on Tongoa were reportedly destroyed. Total damage in Vanuatu reached VT48.6 billion (US$449 million).

North of Efate, the small island of Mataso was largely destroyed with only two homes left standing after the storm. Residents sought refuge in caves to ride out the storm; two people died there.

The Tukoro, Vanuata's most significant patrol vessel, was washed ashore on Moso Island. Repairs took 16 months.

According to UNESCO, a total of $268.4 million is needed for total recovery and rehabilitation of the nation.

=== Tuvalu ===
Prior to the formation of Cyclone Pam, flooding from king tides, which peaked at 3.4 m (11 ft) on 19 February 2015, caused considerable road damage across the multi-island nation of Tuvalu. Between 10 and 11 March, waves, estimated to be 3–5 m (9.8–16.4 ft), associated with the cyclone swept across the low-lying islands of Tuvalu. The atolls of Nanumea, Nanumanga, Niutao, Nui, Nukufetau, Nukulaelae, and Vaitupu were most affected. Significant damage to agriculture and infrastructure occurred. The outermost islands were hardest hit, with one flooded in its entirety. A state of emergency was subsequently declared on 14 March. Water supplies on Nui were contaminated by seawater and rendered undrinkable. An estimated 45 percent of the nation's nearly 10,000 people were displaced, according to Prime Minister Enele Sopoaga. Damage across the nation amounted to US$92 million. Significant saltwater intrusion occurred on eight islands.

=== Solomon Islands ===
Early in the Cyclone Pam's development, it produced torrential rains and gale-force winds over the Solomon Provinces of Malaita, Makira-Ulawa, and Temotu. Trees and crops were flattened, and residents sheltered in schools and in caves after their homes were destroyed. Rainfall was particularly intense over the Santa Cruz Islands, where a 24‑hour total of 495 mm (19.5 in) was observed. Continuous heavy rain prompted the evacuation of 500 students in West Guadalcanal.

The storm later struck the remote islands of Anuta and Tikopia on 12 March, causing extensive damage. Approximately 1,500 homes were damaged or destroyed in the region and 5,000 people were directly. Powerful winds toppled numerous trees. Several injuries were reported, though exact numbers are unknown. Tikopia's lost roughly 90 percent of its food crop and fruit trees; water sources were also contaminated. Contact with Anuta was lost as all its phone lines failed; the island remained isolated for at least a week after Pam's passage.

=== Fiji ===
Although not in the direct path of Pam, officials in Fiji warned residents in low-lying areas of potential flooding from the system's outer rain bands. On 11 March, the Northern Division activated its Emergency Operations Centre and directed precautionary measures to be undertaken, with the expectation that flash flooding and coastal flooding from high tides were set to occur. Emergency shelters for possible evacuations were identified by 12 March. Fears concerning the Fijian infrastructure's susceptibility to winds and flooding were raised by the Disaster Management Office. Later that day, cruise operators announced that trips to the Yasawa Islands would be cancelled due to the storm. Anticipating dangerous conditions from the cyclone, the fifth leg of the Volvo Ocean Race was postponed until at least 01:00 UTC on 16 March. Other residents were warned not to venture out to sea as Pam passed nearby.

=== New Caledonia ===
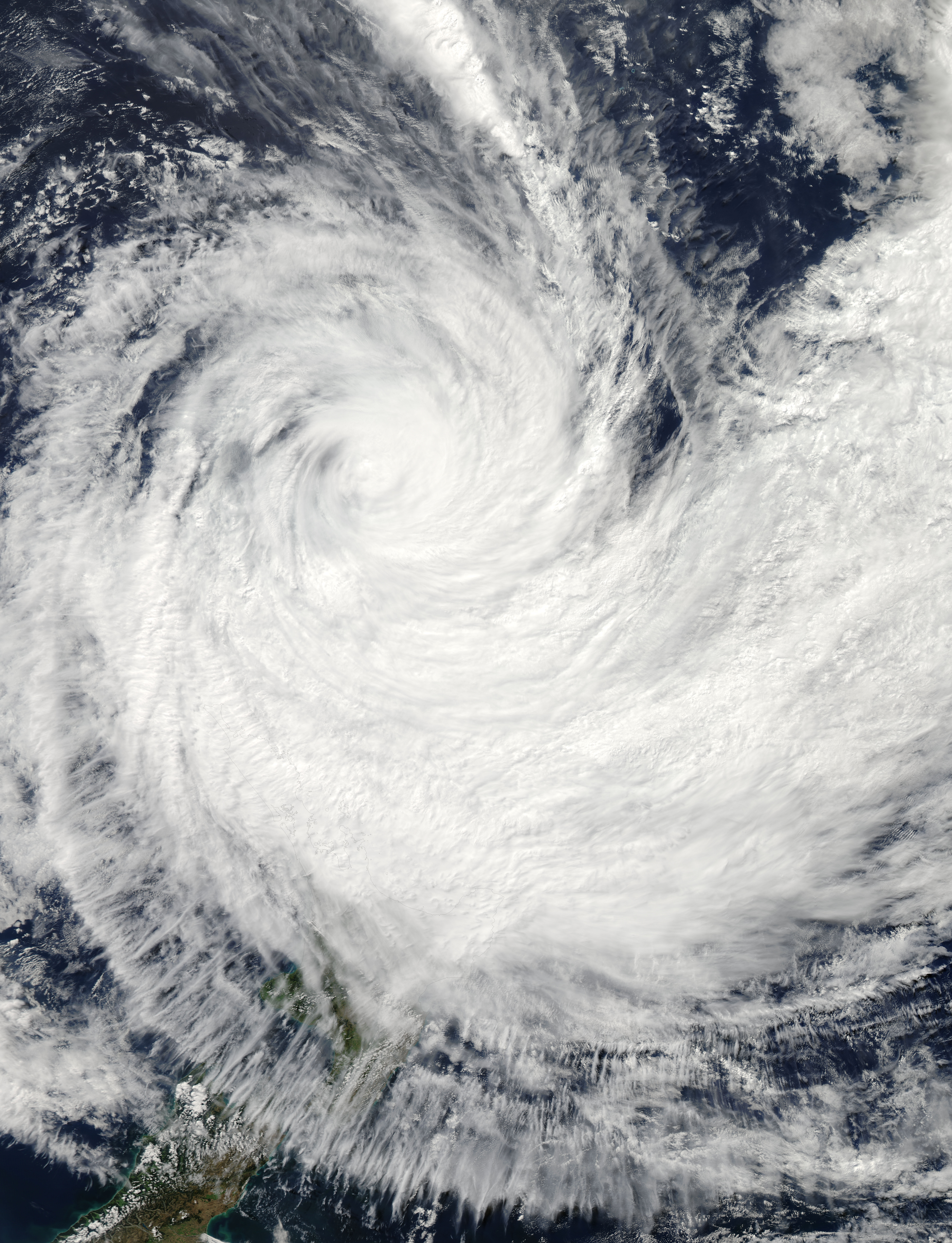
Severe Tropical Cyclone Pam transitioning into an extratropical cyclone to the northeast of New Zealand on 15 March

A pre-cyclone alert was raised in New Caledonia as a precaution. On 13 March 2015 at noon local time, this was raised to the first level of cyclone alert for the Loyalty Islands and for the Isle of Pines. The second and highest level of cyclone alert was raised at 03:00 local time on 14 March 2015 for the islands of Maré and Lifou, and the alert ended at 17:00 and 20:00 local time on the same day. All alert levels were then lifted on Sunday, 15 March at 08:00 local time.

On the whole, material damages were relatively light, with a few fallen trees, a few roofs blown out, and only 26 people in need of emergency housing (18 on Maré and 8 on Lifou). At the height of the storm, a maximum of 6000 inhabitants suffered power outages, but power was then restored fairly quickly to the vast majority. As perceived by the population of the Loyalty Islands, the worst damage was in fact the loss of the yams harvest, which will affect numerous communities of both Maré and Lifou, both as a means of subsistence for the coming season and as a cultural apparatus for ceremonies like weddings.

=== New Zealand ===
Civil Defense officials in New Zealand issued severe weather warnings, that the remnants of Cyclone Pam could bring unprecedented damage to much of the northeastern coastal areas of the North Island. Swells of 6–8 m (20–26 ft) were forecast with potential for damage exceeding that of Cyclone Bola – which struck New Zealand's North Island in 1988.

On 15 March gale-force winds began affecting northern parts of the North Island and continued into the following day, with gusts peaking at 148 km/h (92 mph) in Kaeo and 144 km/h (89 mph) in Hicks Bay. Some voluntary evacuations took place in the Gisborne region. Power outages took place in the Whangarei District. Heavy rains accompanied the system as well, with over 200 mm (7.9 in) falling in areas between Hicks Bay and Gisborne. Along the coast, waves reached 4.5 m (15 ft) in Tutukaka and 5–6 m (16–20 ft) near Tolaga Bay. The cyclone also brought cooler temperatures throughout most of the North Island and northern South Island.

The storm later brought winds up to 140 km/h (87 mph) to the Chatham Islands (pop: 650), prompting the declaration of a civil defence emergency. Downed trees cut power to portions of the islands, though no major damage was reported. Twelve people sought refuge in a public shelter. A wharf on the north side of the islands was damaged by rough seas. Insurance loss in New Zealand amounted to NZ$2.2 million (US$1.63 million).

== Aftermath ==
An RAAF Lockheed P-3 Orion was dispatched to the eastern Solomon Islands for aerial damage surveys.

=== Vanuatu ===
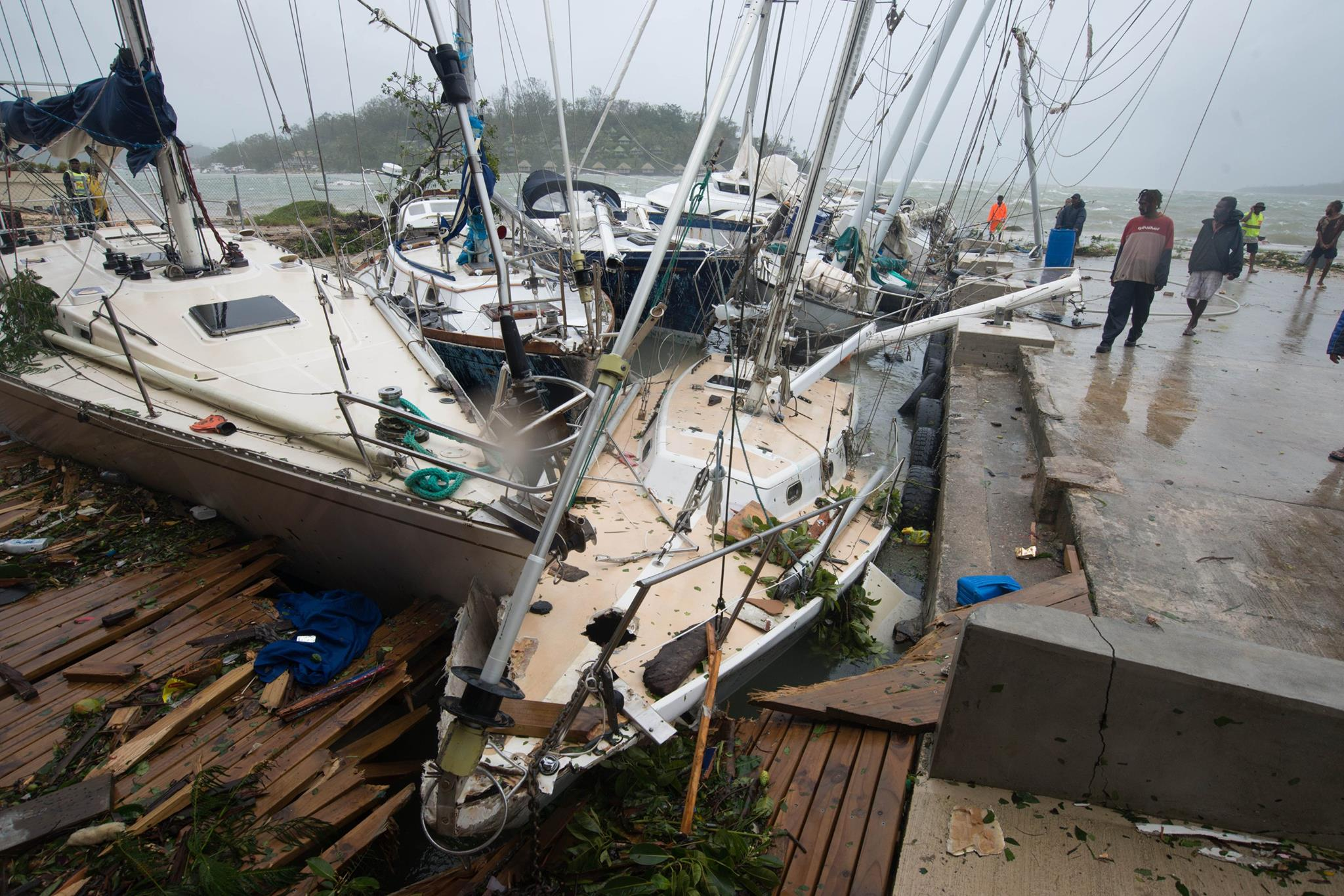
Yachts wrecked by the storm in a harbour near Port Vila, Vanuatu

Before the disaster, many developed countries pledged funds to assist smaller, developing nations with disaster preparation and relief efforts. Jim Yong Kim, president of the World Bank, has called for insurance schemes to help the Vanuatu government respond to natural disasters. United Nations Secretary-General Ban Ki-moon highlighted that climate change leads to increased risks of natural disasters.

While attending the World Conference on Disaster Risk Reduction in Sendai, Japan, Vanuatu President Baldwin Lonsdale requested international assistance for his people. Immediately following the cyclone's impact in Vanuatu, governments across the world began providing aid relief funds. Sufficient repairs of Bauerfield International Airport were completed by 14 March to allow the first flights from Australia carrying aid to arrive. Initial monetary assistance included $3.8 million from Australia, $2.9 million from the United Kingdom, $1.8 million from New Zealand, and $1.05 million from the European Union, $250,000 from India and promised to extend any further assistance required. The French overseas territories of New Caledonia and French Polynesia have granted €300,000 (US$318,000) of immediate emergency aid.

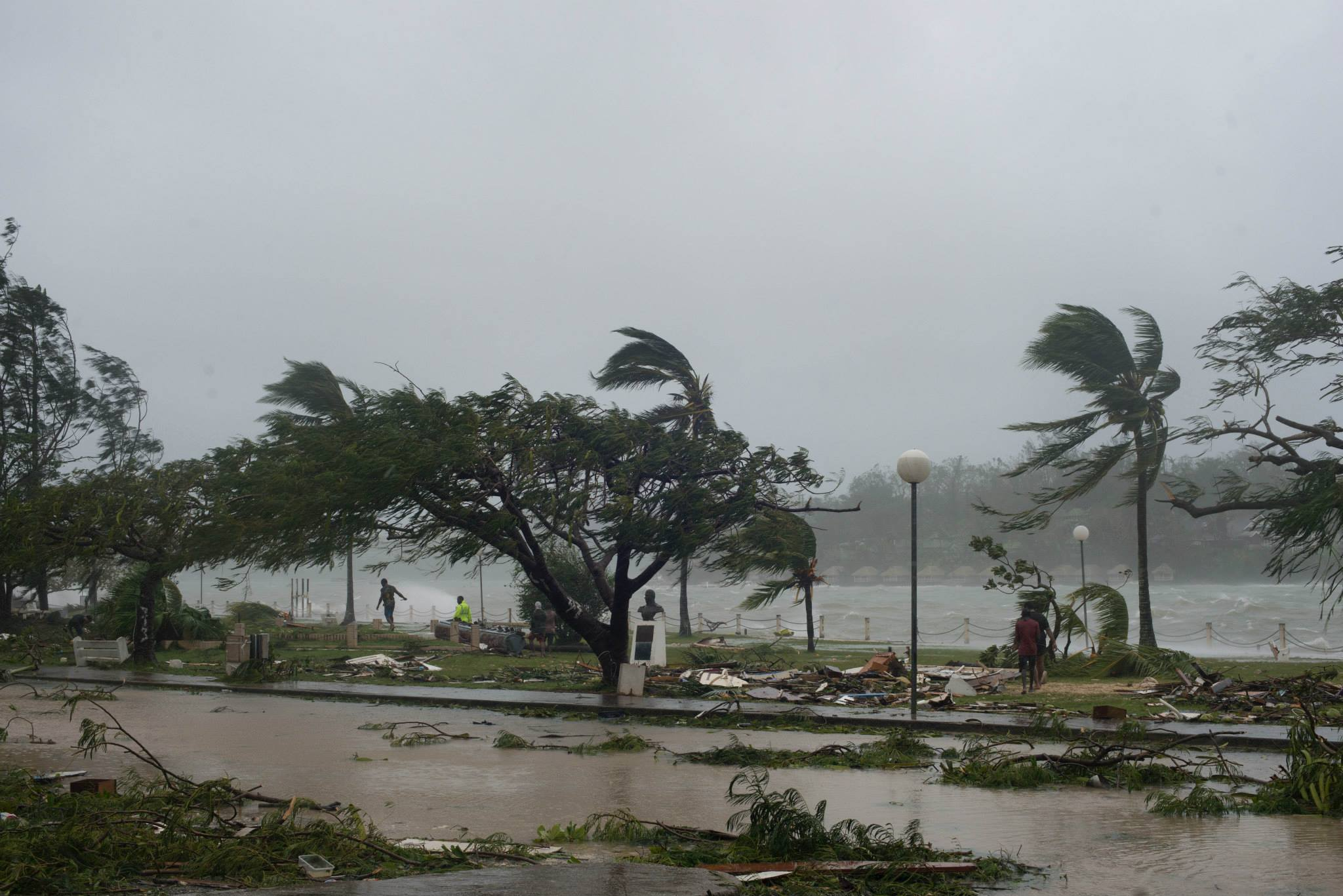
Port Vila seafront on 14 March

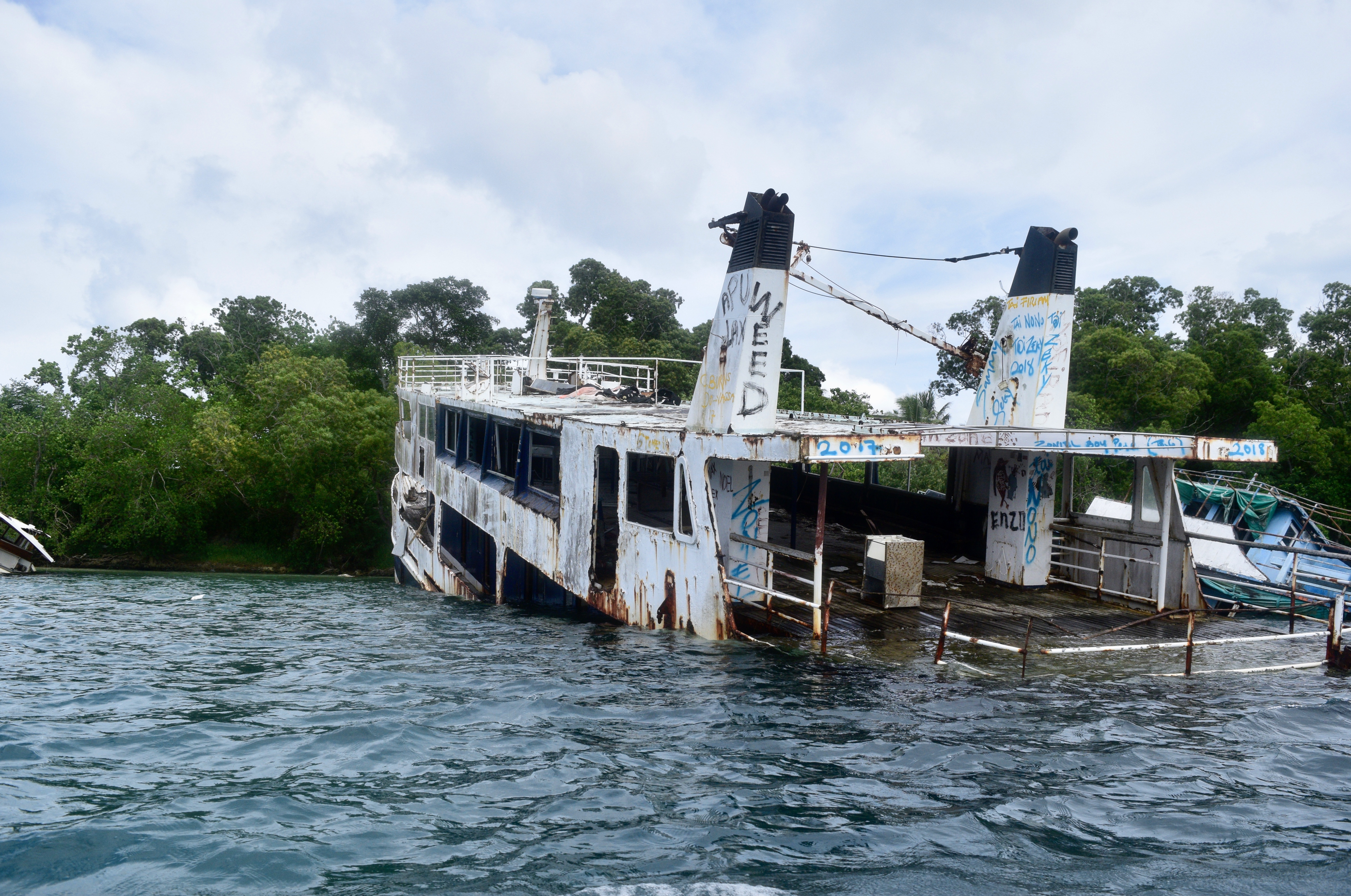
Remaining debris in Vanuatu three years after Cyclone Pam. Photo captured in 2018.

Australia, France, and New Zealand enacted a coordinated response within the framework of the FRANZ agreement, in which France would carry out damage assessments while Australia and New Zealand would provide humanitarian aid. In accordance with this, France ordered the frigate Vendémiaire to sail from Nouméa, New Caledonia, to conduct surveys along with aircraft from the island territory. On 15 March, Australia confirmed that supplies for up to 5,000 people would be sent via two Royal Australian Air Force (RAAF) Boeing C-17 Globemaster III aircraft. A Lockheed C-130 Hercules was also deployed with emergency evaluation personnel and Department of Foreign Affairs officials to determine specifics on aid required. On 15 March a CASA-235 transport plane was dispatched from the New Caledonian Armed Forces airbase carrying engineers to repair the water supply, a Red Cross technician and spare parts to enable the reopening of the airport to scheduled flights. A second CASA-235 was dispatched from French Polynesia carrying tools for rebuilding, satelitte communications, tents and logistics supplies for 10 days.

Costliest South Pacific Ocean tropical cyclones
Rank	Tropical cyclones	Season	Damage USD	Refs
1	3 Gabrielle	2022–23	$9.2 billion	
2	TD 06F	2022–23	$1.43 billion	
3	5 Winston	2015–16	$1.4 billion	
4	5 Harold	2019–20	$768 million	
5	5 Pam	2014–15	$543 million	
6	5 Judy and Kevin	2022–23	$433 million	
7	4 Val	1991–92	$381 million	
8	5 Lola	2023–24	$352 million	
9	4 Evan	2012–13	$313 million	
10	4 Gita	2017–18	$253 million	

More than four days after the storm, much of the affected population had yet to be reached. A lack of airstrips and deepwater ports hampered the speed of relief operations. Save the Children's Vanuatu director, Tom Skirrow, stated that the logistical challenges presented with Cyclone Pam greatly exceeded that of Typhoon Haiyan which left over 7,350 dead or missing in the Philippines during November 2013. Residents on Moso Island, located just north of Efate, were forced to drink saltwater. Survivors stated that no aid had reached them as of 17 March, and most were forced to scavenge for food. It was not until 27 March, two weeks after Pam struck, that aid finally reached all of the affected islands.

On 24 March, IsraAid reached Tongoa in the Shepherds Islands group by boat, and distributed over 40 tons of rice, flour and water to twelve villages and eight schools on two islands levelled by the cyclone.

The Adventist Development and Relief Agency responded by distributing shelter kits, water filtration kits and food packages, as well as setting up 10 evacuation centres in Port Vila. In total, ADRA assisted more than 10,000 people in 2586 households across three islands.

=== Tuvalu ===
New Zealand started providing aid to Tuvalu on 14 March. Owing to the severity of damage in the nation, the local chapter of the Red Cross enacted an emergency operation plan on 16 March which would focus on the needs of 3,000 people. The focus on the 81,873 CHF operation was to provide essential non-food items and shelter. Flights carrying these supplies from Fiji began on 17 March. Prime Minister Sopoaga stated that Tuvalu appeared capable of handling the disaster on its own and urged that international relief be focused on Vanuatu. Tuvalu's Disaster Coordinator, Suneo Silu, said the priority island is Nui as sources of fresh water were contaminated. On 17 March, the Taiwanese Ministry of Foreign Affairs announced a donation of US$61,000 in aid to Tuvalu. UNICEF and Australia have committed to deliver aid to Tuvalu.

As of 22 March 71 families (40 percent of the population) of Nui remain displaced and were living in 3 evacuation centres or with other families and on Nukufetau, 76 people (13 percent of the population) remain displaced and were living in 2 evacuation centres.

The Situation Report published on 30 March reported that on Nukufetau all the displaced people have returned to their homes. Nui suffered the most damage of the three central islands (Nui, Nukufetau and Vaitupu); with both Nui and Nukufetau suffering the loss of 90% of the crops. Of the three northern islands (Nanumanga, Niutao, Nanumea), Nanumanga suffered the most damage, with 60–100 houses flooded and damage to the health facility. The number of influenza cases that had been reported in Nanumanga had stabilised.

== See also ==
- List of the most intense tropical cyclones
  - Cyclone Zoe in 2002 – 240 km/h (150 mph), 890 mbar (hPa; 26.28 inHg)
  - Cyclone Percy in 2005 – 230 km/h (145 mph), 900 mbar (hPa; 26.58 inHg)
  - Cyclones Ron and Susan in 1998 – 230 km/h (145 mph), 900 mbar (hPa; 26.58 inHg)
  - Cyclone Yasa in 2020 - 230 km/h (145 mph), 917 mbar (hPa; 27:08 inHg)
- Cyclone Atu – a strong cyclone in 2011 that impacted Vanuatu
- Cyclone Fran – a strong cyclone in 1992 that impacted Vanuatu as a Category 5 severe tropical cyclone
- Cyclone Winston – the strongest cyclone recorded in the South Pacific; impacted Fiji as a Category 5 severe tropical cyclone in 2016
- Cyclone Harold – a strong cyclone in 2020 and the strongest cyclone to impact Vanuatu since Pam.
