= Cyclone Zoe =

2002 tropical cyclone

Severe Tropical Cyclone Zoe
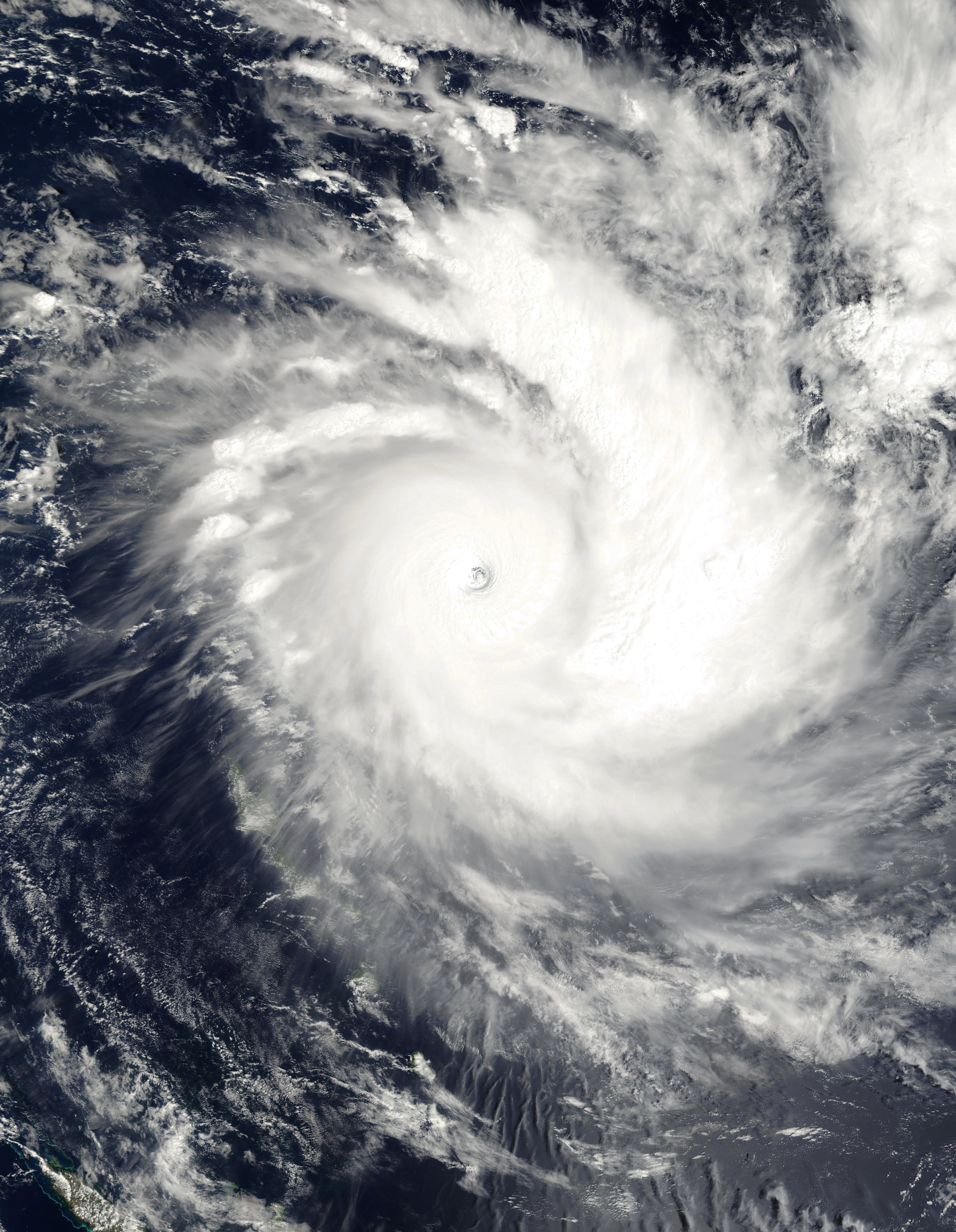
- Cyclone Zoe near peak intensity on December 27

Meteorological history
- Formed: December 23, 2002
- Extratropical: January 2, 2003
- Dissipated: January 4, 2003

Category 5 severe tropical cyclone
- 10-minute sustained (FMS)
- Highest winds: 240 km/h (150 mph)
- Lowest pressure: 890 hPa (mbar); 26.28 inHg (Second-lowest in Southern Hemisphere)

Category 5-equivalent tropical cyclone
- 1-minute sustained (SSHWS/JTWC)
- Highest winds: 285 km/h (180 mph)
- Lowest pressure: 879 hPa (mbar); 25.96 inHg

Overall effects
- Fatalities: None
- Areas affected: Solomon Islands, Fiji, Vanuatu, Rotuma
- IBTrACS
- Part of the 2002–03 South Pacific cyclone season

Severe Tropical Cyclone Zoe was the second-most intense tropical cyclone on record within the Southern Hemisphere and was the strongest tropical cyclone worldwide in 2002. The system was first noted on December 23, 2002, as a tropical depression that had developed, within the South Pacific Convergence Zone to the east of Tuvalu. Over the next couple of days, the system moved southwestwards and crossed the International Dateline early on December 25. After this, the system became better organized and was declared to be a tropical cyclone and named Zoe later that day. Zoe subsequently rapidly intensified in very favorable conditions as it continued to move west-southwest towards the Solomon Islands. The system subsequently became a Category 5 tropical cyclone on both the Australian tropical cyclone intensity scale and the Saffir-Simpson hurricane wind scale on December 27. The system subsequently affected the Solomon Islands Temotu Province during that day, before it peaked with 10-minute sustained wind speeds of 240 km/h (150 mph). As the system peaked, it performed a small clockwise cyclonic loop within the vicinity of Tikopia island, as a result of the steering flow over the cyclone becoming weak and variable. The system subsequently started to move towards the southeast during December 29, in response to a strengthening steering flow, provided by an upper level trough of low pressure and a baroclinic system near New Caledonia. Over the next few days the system weakened and degenerated into a tropical depression during January 1, 2003. The system was subsequently last noted during January 4, while it was located to the southeast of New Caledonia.

Cyclone Zoe severely affected areas of Rotuma, the Solomon Islands, and Vanuatu. Heavy rainfall and strong winds were particularly disastrous to the Solomon Islands, especially on the islands of Anuta and Tikopia. There, numerous crops and fruit–bearing trees were destroyed. Beaches were also heavily eroded due to the high waves generated by the cyclone. Although effects were lesser in Vanuatu, the country's northernmost islands experienced heavy flooding and beaches destroyed by high waves. After this usage of the name Zoe, the name was retired.

== Meteorological history ==
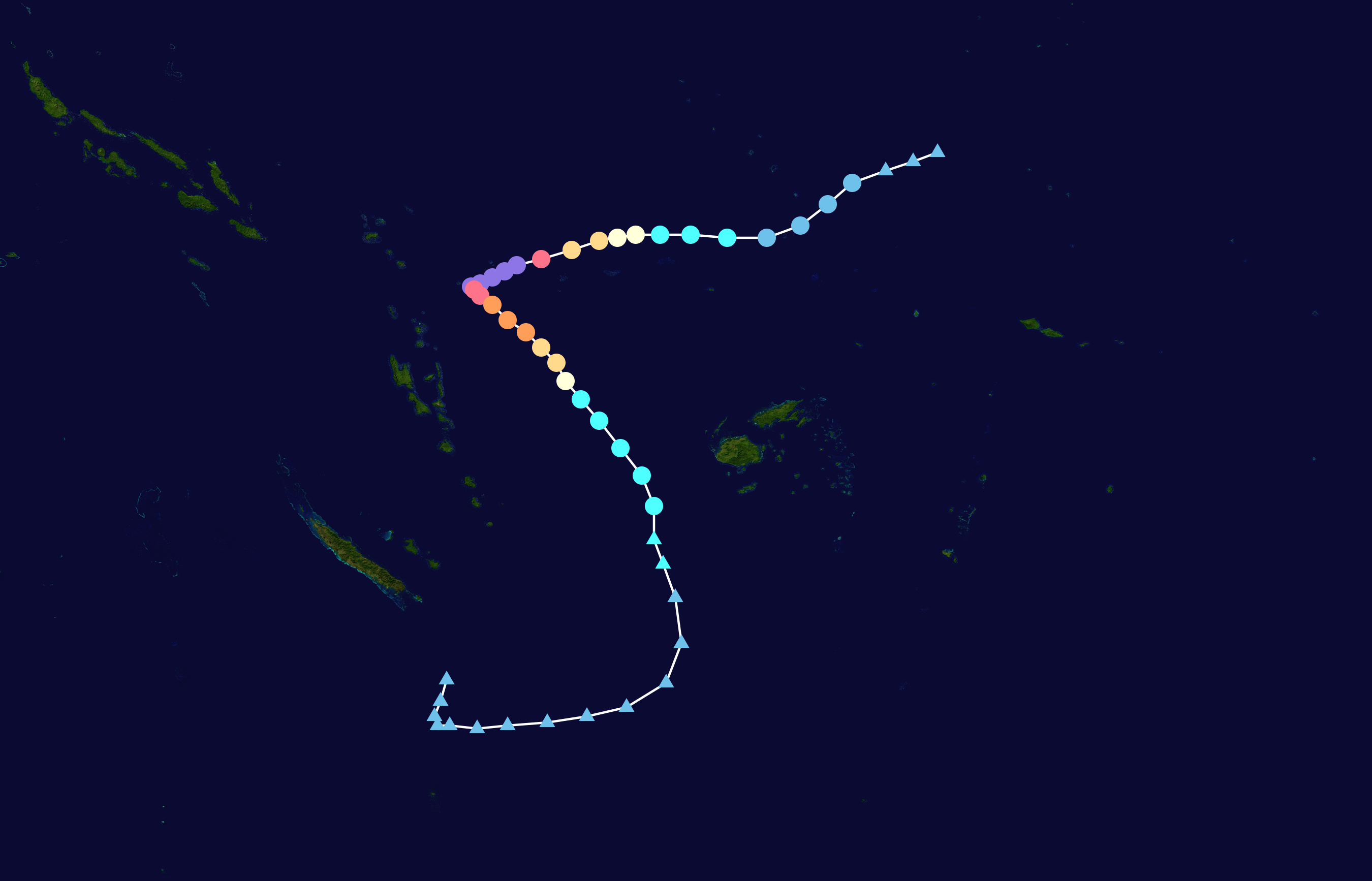
Map plotting the storm's track and intensity, according to the Saffir–Simpson scale Map key Saffir–Simpson scale Tropical depression (≤38 mph, ≤62 km/h) Tropical storm (39–73 mph, 63–118 km/h) Category 1 (74–95 mph, 119–153 km/h) Category 2 (96–110 mph, 154–177 km/h) Category 3 (111–129 mph, 178–208 km/h) Category 4 (130–156 mph, 209–251 km/h) Category 5 (≥157 mph, ≥252 km/h) Unknown Storm type Tropical cyclone Subtropical cyclone Extratropical cyclone, remnant low, tropical disturbance, or monsoon depression

The origins of Severe Tropical Cyclone Zoe can be traced back to a convective cloud cluster, that had developed by December 22, within the South Pacific Convergence Zone to the north of the Samoan Islands. The system subsequently emerged out of the South Pacific Convergence Zone and was classified as Tropical Depression 04F, while it was located to the east of Funafuti in Tuvalu. Over the next couple of days the system was steered towards the west-southwest, under the influence of a mid-level subtropical ridge of high pressure.

After the depression had crossed the International Dateline early on December 25, atmospheric convection surrounding 04F increased and the system became better organized. At this time vertical wind shear over the system rapidly decreased, while the systems outflow significantly improved. As a result, the United States Joint Typhoon Warning Center (JTWC) issued a Tropical Cyclone Formation Alert on the system, before they initiated advisories on the system and designated it as Tropical Cyclone 06P. Later that day at 21:00 UTC (08:00 December 26 SIT) the FMS reported that the depression had become a Category 1 tropical cyclone, on the Australian tropical cyclone intensity scale and named it Zoe. At this time the system was located about 220 km (135 mi) to the northwest of the Fijian Dependency; Rotuma and moving westwards at about 18 km/h (11 mph).

After being named, Zoe intensified very rapidly in very favorable conditions and became a Category 3 severe tropical cyclone by 12:00 UTC (23:00 SIT) on December 26. Zoe's eye subsequently became obvious on both visible and infrared satellite imagery, while the system continued to intensify and became a Category 5 severe tropical cyclone during December 27. During December 27, the JTWC reported that Zoe had become equivalent to a category 5 hurricane on the Saffir-Simpson hurricane wind scale as it peaked with 1-minute windspeeds of 285 km/h (180 mph) and passed about 50 km (30 mi) to the southeast of the Solomon Island: Anuta. Zoe subsequently turned towards the southwest and passed in between the Solomon Islands of Anuta and Fataka, as the subtropical ridge weakened in response to an upper level trough of low pressure over the Tasman Sea. Early on December 28, the FMS estimated that the system had peaked as a Category 5 severe tropical cyclone, with 10-minute sustained wind speeds of 240 km/h (150 mph) and a minimum pressure of 890 hPa (26.28 inHg). By this time the steering flow over the cyclone had become weak and variable, as the system passed within 30 km (20 mi) of the island of Tikopia. As a result, Zoe virtually stalled and performed a small clockwise cyclonic loop, within the vicinity of Tikopia, however, the eye of the system did not pass over the island.

During December 29, after the system had stalled, Zoe started to move towards the southeast in response to the strengthening steering flow, provided by an upper level trough of low pressure and a baroclinic system near New Caledonia. Over the next couple of days the system rapidly weakened under the influence of: strengthening vertical wind shear, dry air and cooler sea surface temperatures. During December 31, as the system continued its southeastwards movement, it passed about 390 km (240 mi) to the southwest of Nadi, Fiji as a Category 2 tropical cyclone. By this time the system was transitioning into an extra tropical cyclone, while deep convection surrounding the system had significantly diminished. As a result of further weakening, the JTWC issued their final warning on Zoe during January 1, 2003, while the FMS reported that Zoe had weakened into a tropical depression. The system was subsequently recurved and started to move towards the southwest during January 2, before it was declared extratropical as it interacted with an extratropical low which was located over the Tasman Sea. Zoe was subsequently last noted by the FMS during January 4, while it was located about 367 km (230 mi) to the southeast of Noumea, New Caledonia.

=== Intensity ===
At its peak intensity Zoe was estimated by the FMS to be a Category 5 severe tropical cyclone, with 10-minute sustained wind speeds of 240 km/h (150 mph) and a minimum pressure of 890 hPa (26.28 inHg). Zoe was the most intense tropical cyclone in the Southern Hemisphere until a 2017 reanalysis of Cyclone Winston estimated a minimum pressure of 884 hPa (26.10 inHg), surpassing Zoe. The United States Joint Typhoon Warning Center reported that the system had peaked with 1-minute sustained wind speeds of 285 km/h (180 mph) and a minimum pressure of 879 hPa (25.96 inHg). Both of these intensity estimates were based on a subjective application of the Dvorak technique, as there were no direct observations of the system's intensity.

== Preparations and impact ==
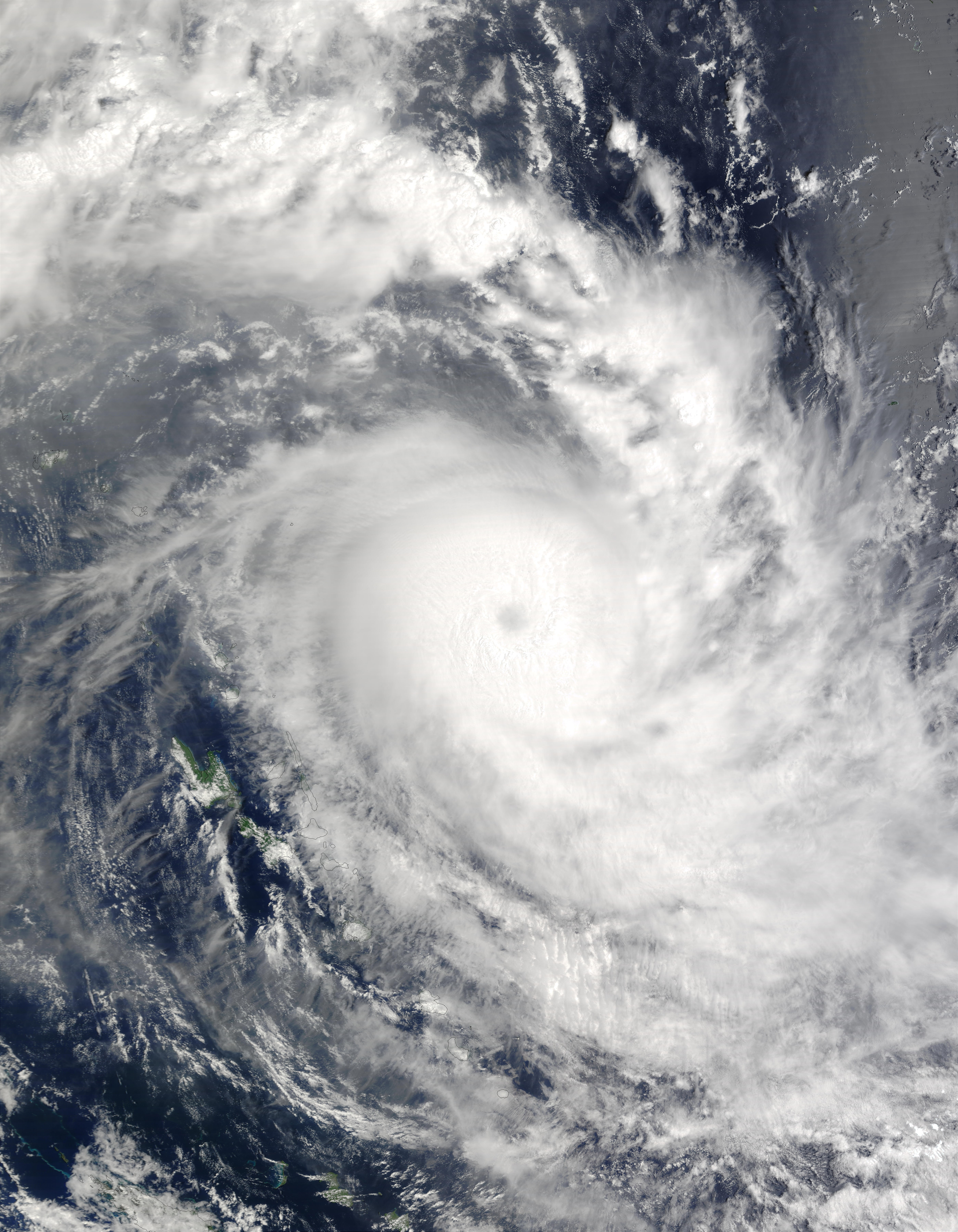
Cyclone Zoe near Vanuatu on December 29

Severe Tropical Cyclone Zoe primarily affected the Solomon Islands of Anuta, Tikopia, Vanikoro, Utupua and the uninhabited island of Fatutaka between December 27–30, 2002. The system and associated trough of low pressure, subsequently impacted Fiji and the northern islands of Vanuatu. However, there were no deaths reported, as a result of Severe Tropical Cyclone Zoe. As a result of the impact of this system, the name Zoe was retired from the South Pacific tropical cyclone naming lists by the World Meteorological Organization.

Early on December 26, both RSMC Nadi and TCWC Brisbane started to issue warnings to support the meteorological services of Vanuatu and the Solomon Islands in tracking the cyclone. TCWC Brisbane cancelled their advisories for the Solomon Islands, late on December 29 while RSMC Nadi continued to issue advisories for Vanuatu until early the next day. Due to a number of problems with the Solomon Islands Weather Service, such as the rent not being paid on the offices they were working out of and the supply of electricity being unreliable, TCWC Brisbane sent the first advisory directly to the Solomon Islands Broadcasting Corporation (SIBC), so they could broadcast them through its network. These were broadcast in English only. After confirmation that the warnings were being received by the SIBC, TCWC Brisbane started to pass warnings to them every 3 hours. The next day Radio Australia was contacted so that arrangements could be made for them to receive and broadcast the warnings. Initial concerns that warning messages had not gotten through arose because there was no two-way radio communication with people on either Tikopia or Anuta, thus authorities had no way of knowing what information people had received and no other way of informing them. However, when communications were restored after the cyclone threat had passed it was discovered that some of the warnings had been received when a shortwave reception was available at various times, until late on December 27 when communications were cut. Those people who could not understand the warnings, were advised by runners who went from hut to hut and to churches to advise people about the oncoming storm, People started preparing straight away cutting Palm fronds and banana trunks in an attempt to support and strengthen roofs and walls. Celebrations to celebrate the new year were cancelled, or moved into communal huts with people sheltering indoors. There were no attempts to evacuate until Zoe had become so intense that dwellings were threatened with imminent inundation or had begun to break up.

Although Zoe never met large land masses, it did affect several inhabited islands which had a total population of around 1700.

The most severe damage wrought by Zoe took place on Tikopia which was completely decimated. Across Tikopia, no home was left standing after 12 m (39 ft) waves along with 320 km/h (200 mph) winds battered the small island. According to press reports, the island was faced with total devastation and all that remained was "just sand and debris." Five days after the storm struck, there were fears of substantial loss of life as no contact had been made with the hardest hit islands. A photographer who took images of the devastation from the air, stated that it would be a miracle if there was not a large loss of life.

On Anuta 90% of houses remained intact, and 70% of crops undamaged. Communication was lost with the island for a week. Vanuatu was inundated with seawater with villagers collecting fish from their village greens.

=== Fiji ===
During December 26, the FMS issued a strong wind warning for the Fijian dependency of Rotuma, where periods of heavy rain, squally thunderstorms and wind gusts of up to 80 km (50 mi) were expected. The strong wind warning was subsequently cancelled two days later, before further strong wind warnings were issued for the Fijian islands of Viti Levu, Yasawa, Mamanuca, Kadavu, Vatulele and nearby smaller islands as the system moved south-eastwards during December 30. During the following day, Zoe passed about 335 km (210 mi) to the west of Nadi on the island of Viti Levu, before the strong wind warnings were cancelled as 2003 opened. The system produced heavy rain over most of the Fijian islands, as well as strong to marginal gale-force winds, over western and southwestern parts of the island nation. People who lived along the southwestern coasts of Viti Levu reported seeing large waves out to sea, however, according to the FMS none of these waves inundated land areas. There was also no damage was recorded in Fiji from Zoe.

== Aftermath ==
Within days of Zoe's passage, the government of the Solomon Islands declared the affected islands disaster zones. Relief supplies were sent from Honiara by January 5 and international aid followed shortly thereafter. Requests for assistance from New Zealand, Australia and France were made by the Solomon Islands. For nearly a week, residents on Tikopia survived without aid by drinking coconut milk and eating what remained of their food stocks. The first relief vessel finally arrived in the island on January 6, bringing medical supplies and food. Although the island's residents had no warning prior to Zoe's arrival, it was found that they took notice of natural warning signs and sought shelter in caves, resulting in no loss of life. Additional supplies were shipped to Anuta on January 6 by a local ship.

Supplies were delayed for days by Solomon Island police as they requested further pay before shipping supplies to the islands. Against the millions of dollars pledged by Australia, only $270,000 had been provided by January 4.

== See also ==
- Cyclone Yasa
- Cyclone Ian
- Cyclone Pam
- Cyclone Percy
- Cyclone Tia
- Cyclone Harold
- Cyclone Winston – Most powerful storm recorded in the Southern Hemisphere
