= Cyclone Tia =

Category 2 South Pacific cyclone in 1991

Severe Tropical Cyclone Tia
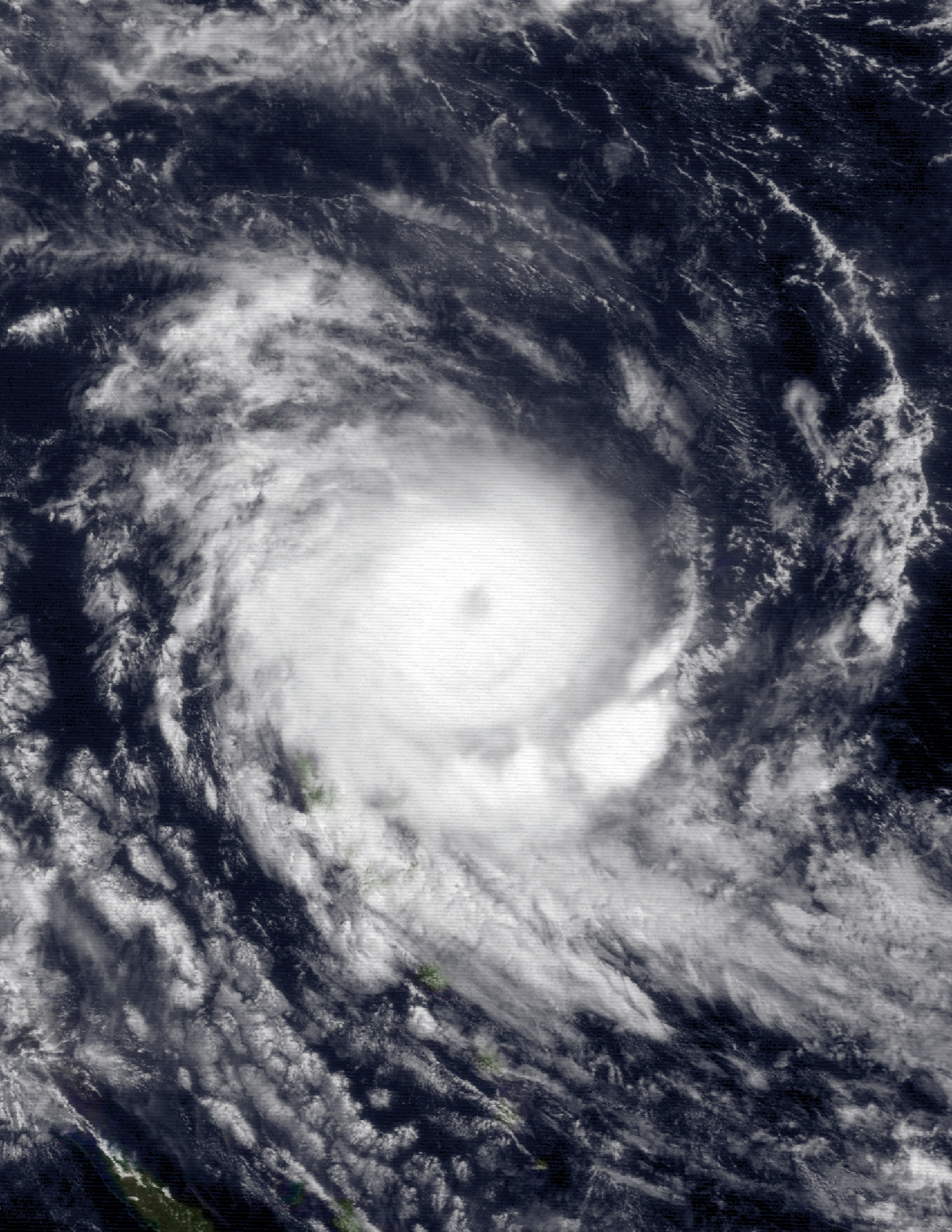
- Cyclone Tia while near its peak intensity

Meteorological history
- Formed: November 13, 1991
- Dissipated: November 21, 1991

Category 3 severe tropical cyclone
- 10-minute sustained (FMS)
- Highest winds: 140 km/h (85 mph)
- Lowest pressure: 960 hPa (mbar); 28.35 inHg

Category 2-equivalent tropical cyclone
- 1-minute sustained (SSHWS/JTWC)
- Highest winds: 175 km/h (110 mph)

Overall effects
- Fatalities: None
- Areas affected: Kiribati, Solomon Islands, Vanuatu
- IBTrACS
- Part of the 1991–92 South Pacific cyclone season

Severe Tropical Cyclone Tia was the first of six tropical cyclones to affect Vanuatu during the 1991–92 South Pacific cyclone season. The system was first noted within the South Pacific convergence zone as a small tropical depression on November 13, to the northeast of the Solomon Islands. Over the next few days the system gradually developed further within an area of light winds in the upper troposphere, before it was named Tia early on November 16. Later that day due to a developing northerly steering current, the system slowed and undertook a small anticlockwise loop before starting to move towards the southwest and rapidly intensify. After rapidly intensifying throughout November 16 and 17, Tia passed within 55 km (35 mi) of the Solomon Island: Anuta at around 1800 UTC on November 17, before passing near Tikopia Island six hours later. As Tia moved near Tikopia, the system reached its peak intensity as a category 3 severe tropical cyclone, with 10‑minute sustained windspeeds of 140 km/h (85 mph).

During November 18, due to cooler waters and increased wind shear, Tia started to weaken as it moved southwards under the influence of a strengthening upper-level northerly wind flow. Over the next 24 hours, the system continued to move southwards and passed within 150 km (95 mi) of Vanuatu's Banks Islands, while gradually weakening further. Tia subsequently degenerated into a tropical depression during November 20, before it was last noted the next day as it crossed a part of its former track, where it had been producing hurricane-force wind speeds a few days earlier. While it was active Tia directly affected the Solomon Islands and Vanuatu, while it indirectly affected Kiribati. The Solomon Island of Tikopia was the worst affected island, after more than 1,000 people were left homeless on the island and 90% of all dwellings were destroyed. Damage was minimal in Vanuatu, and was mainly confined to crops and fruit trees on the Banks and Torres Islands. After this usage of the name Tia, the name was retired and withdrawn from use on the tropical cyclone naming lists.

== Meteorological history ==
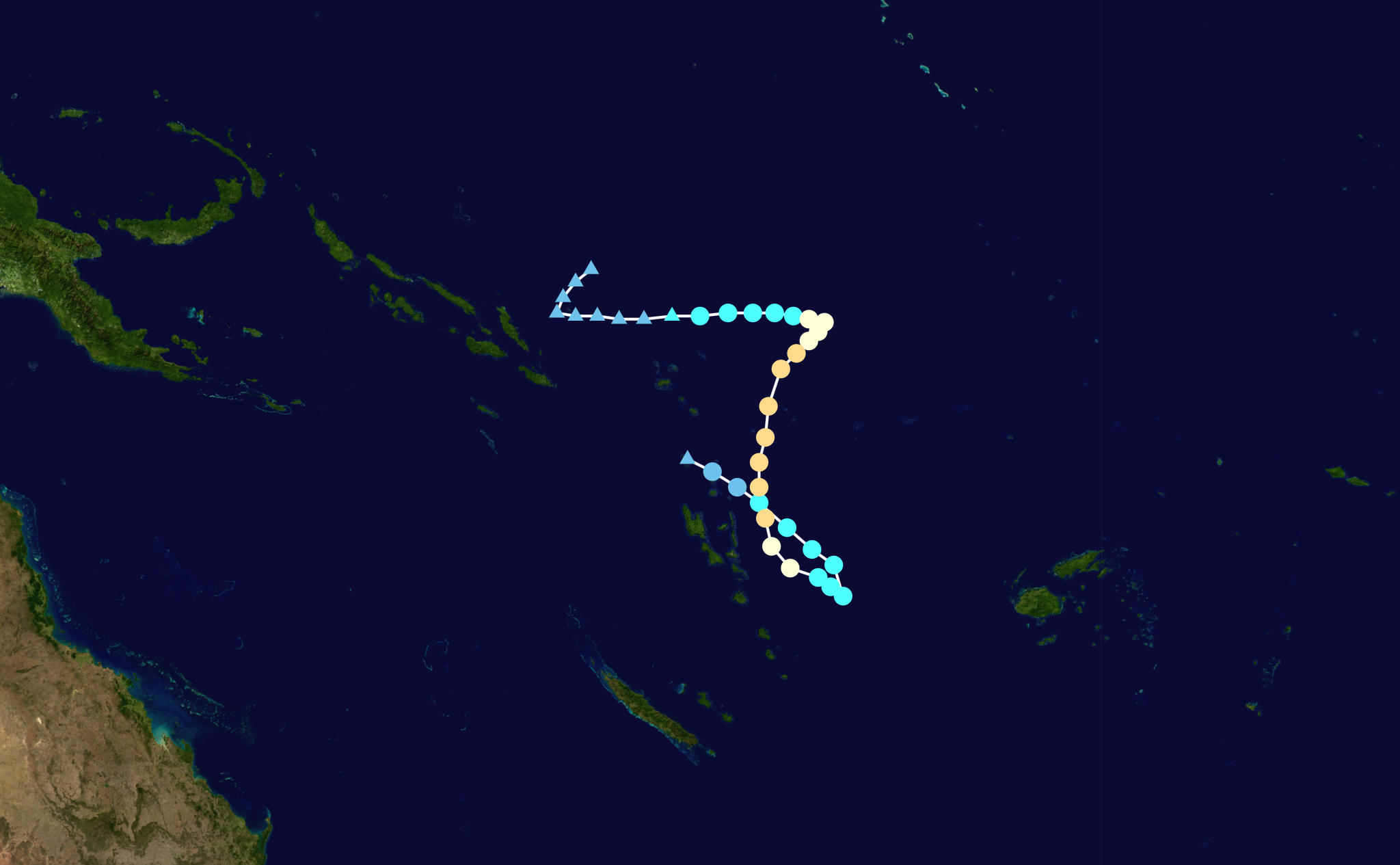
Map plotting the storm's track and intensity, according to the Saffir–Simpson scale Map key Saffir–Simpson scale Tropical depression (≤38 mph, ≤62 km/h) Tropical storm (39–73 mph, 63–118 km/h) Category 1 (74–95 mph, 119–153 km/h) Category 2 (96–110 mph, 154–177 km/h) Category 3 (111–129 mph, 178–208 km/h) Category 4 (130–156 mph, 209–251 km/h) Category 5 (≥157 mph, ≥252 km/h) Unknown Storm type Tropical cyclone Subtropical cyclone Extratropical cyclone, remnant low, tropical disturbance, or monsoon depression

A small tropical depression developed within the South Pacific convergence zone, to the northeast of the Solomon Islands during November 13. During that day the system moved towards the south-west, before it sharply turned towards the east early the next day, as an equatorial westerly wind burst took place to the north of the cyclone. The depression subsequently gradually developed further, within an area of light winds in the upper troposphere and sea-surface temperatures of over 30 °C (86 °F). Early on November 15, the United States Joint Typhoon Warning Center initiated advisories on the depression and designated it as Tropical Cyclone 03P, after it had become equivalent to a tropical storm. During that day the system's upper level outflow characteristics became more favourable for further development, before the system was named Tia by the Fiji Meteorological Service (FMS) after the system had developed into a Category 1 tropical cyclone on the Australian tropical cyclone intensity scale. When it was named, Tia moving slowly and was located about 465 km (290 mi) to the northeast of the Santa Cruz Islands, before the JTWC reported at around 0600 UTC that Tia had become equivalent to a category 1 hurricane on the Saffir–Simpson hurricane scale with 1‑minute sustained windspeeds of 120 km/h (75 mph). Around this time, because of a developing northerly steering current, Tia slowed and undertook a small anticlockwise loop, before starting to move towards the southwest and rapidly intensify.

After rapidly intensifying throughout November 16 and 17, Tia passed within 55 km (35 mi) of Anuta Island at around 1800 UTC on November 17, before passing near Tikopia Island six hours later. As Tia moved near Tikopia, the FMS reported that the system had reached its peak intensity as a category 3 severe tropical cyclone, with sustained wind speeds of 140 km/h (85 mph). The JTWC followed suit six hours later and reported that the cyclone had peaked as a category 2 equivalent hurricane with sustained wind speeds of 165 km/h (105 mph). By 1800 UTC on November 18, due to cooler waters and increased wind shear, Tia started to weaken as it moved southwards under the influence of a strengthening upper-level northerly wind flow. Over the next 24 hours, the system continued to move southwards and passed within 150 km (95 mi) of Vanuatu's Banks Islands, while gradually weakening further before moving to the southeast under the influence of strong upper-level northwesterlies. By 0000 UTC on November 20, Tia had weakened into a category 1 tropical cyclone on the Australian Scale and became slow moving while located about 370 km (230 mi) to the east of Port Villa in Vanuatu. During that day the system turned and moved towards the northwest before the FMS reported later that day at 1200 UTC, that Tia had weakened below tropical cyclone intensity. However, the JTWC monitored the system as a tropical cyclone for another 24 hours, before issuing their final advisory on the system at 1200 UTC as the system had weakened below tropical cyclone intensity. Tia was subsequently last noted by the FMS and JTWC later that day as it crossed a part of its former track, where it had been producing hurricane-force windspeeds a few days earlier.

== Preparations and impact ==
Apart from several smaller islands no major inhabited islands lied in the path of Tia, while no deaths were associated with the system. After this usage of the name Tia, the name was retired and withdrawn from use on the tropical cyclone naming lists.

=== Solomon Islands ===
During November 17, warnings were issued by the Solomon Islands Meteorological Service for parts of Temotu Province in the Solomon Islands, after it became apparent that Tia was moving towards the easternmost islands of Anuta and Tikopia. During that day, the system affected the province and passed within 55 km (35 mi) of Anuta, where the automatic weather station recorded hurricane force wind speeds of 133 km/h (83 mph), wind gusts of 172 km/h (107 mph) and a minimum pressure of 987.9 hPa (29.17 inHg). The system subsequently passed near or over the island of Tikopia, which was where the worst of the damage was reported. 160 of the 180 houses, six of the seven churches and all but one of the classrooms on the island were destroyed by Tia, while the rest of the houses were damaged. The system also damaged the islands water supply and vegetable gardens, flattened its coconut trees and destroyed food crops such as Taro. On both islands there were no reports of any casualties, however, over 1000 people were left homeless, while high seas and waves caused extensive damage to the coasts and flooded low-lying areas. The National Disaster Council subsequently declared Tikopia to be a disaster area, while the government purchased approximately $1.5 million dollars' worth of food, tents, palm leaves and various other materials from Makira province for relief efforts on the two islands.

=== Other islands ===
On November 16, the Kiribati islands suffered the side-effects of Cyclone Tia, with several houses in Tarawa and seaweed farms damaged. Late on November 17, the FMS started to release special advisories for Vanuatu after it had become clear that the systems south-southwest movement, would bring the cyclone sufficiently close to the Banks and Torres Islands to cause either gale or storm force winds. Over the next 24 hours, the FMS continued to issue these bulletins as the system moved southwards and brought gale-force winds to Maewo, Pentecost and the Banks Islands before they issued the final advisory early on November 19. Tia was the first of six tropical cyclones to affect Vanuatu during the 1991–92 South Pacific cyclone season, and caused minor damage that was mainly confined to houses, crops and fruit trees on the Banks and Torres Islands. Within the Banks Islands a church was flattened, several roads were blocked and a man was slightly injured by flying debris.

== See also ==
- Cyclone Zoe
