= Richard Feinberg =

American anthropologist, writer, and educator

- Occupations: Anthropologist, writer, and educator
- Employer: Kent State University
- Known for: Sociocultural Polynesian (Solomon Islands and Papua New Guinea) anthropology
- Board member of: Association of Senior Anthropologists
- Honours: 2019 Fulbright Distinguished Chair of Anthropology at Palacký University Olomouc in the Czech Republic

Richard "Rick" Feinberg (born November 4, 1947) is an American anthropologist, writer, educator, and Emeritus Professor focusing on sociocultural anthropology, specifically on Polynesian societies in the Pacific Islands and Native North America. Feinberg completed his Bachelor of Arts at the University of California, Berkeley, in 1969, going on to obtain his Master of Arts in 1971 and a Doctor of Philosophy degree in 1974, both from the University of Chicago.

He has authored several significant works in cultural anthropology, including "Polynesian Oral Traditions: Indigenous Texts and English Translations from Anuta, Solomon Islands", "Anuta: Polynesian Lifeways for the Twenty-First Century", and "Polynesian Seafaring and Navigation Ocean Travel in Anutan Culture and Society". He has edited numerous publications, such as "Seafaring in the Contemporary Pacific Islands: Studies in Continuity and Change" (1995) and "The Cultural Analysis of Kinship: The Legacy of David M. Schneider" (2001). He has conducted research in several locations, including Anuta and Taumako (Solomon Islands), Nukumanu (Papua New Guinea), Atafu (Tokelau), Navajo (New Mexico), and Brady Lake (Ohio, USA).

He has been actively involved in various professional associations, including the American Anthropological Association, the Association for Social Anthropology in Oceania, and the Central States Anthropological Society. Feinberg has been a dedicated educator, teaching at Kent State University since 1974 and contributing significantly to the field of anthropology through his teaching and research. He retired in May 2018.

== Biography ==
=== Personal life ===
Richard Feinberg was born in 1947 in Norfolk, Virginia.

=== Professional background ===
Feinberg began teaching at Kent State University (KSU) in 1974 where he served as a professor from 1986 until his retirement in May 2018. Feinberg's anthropological focus is on the indigenous Polynesian outlier communities of Anuta and Taumako in Solomon Islands, Nukumanu in Papua New Guinea, as well as Atafu in Tokelau, Navajo in New Mexico, and Brady Lake in Ohio.

Feinberg has authored several significant works in cultural anthropology, including "The Anutan Language Reconsidered: Lexicon and Grammar of a Polynesian Outlier" (1977), "Social Change in a Navajo Community" (1979), "Anuta: Social Structure of a Polynesian Island" (1981), and "Oral Traditions of Anuta: A Polynesian Outlier in the Solomon Islands" (1998, reissued electronically in 2011). He has edited numerous publications, such as "Seafaring in the Contemporary Pacific Islands: Studies in Continuity and Change" (1995) and "The Cultural Analysis of Kinship: The Legacy of David M. Schneider" (2001).

Feinberg has served in various editorial and leadership roles. He has been a Central Status Anthropological Society (CSAS) member for 40 years. He has also been a reviewer for several publishers and contributed to many conferences, meetings, symposia, and workshops, such as a talk on “Anthropology and the Study of Navigation” at Harvard University’s annual Radcliffe Institute Science Symposium. He served as the American Anthropological Association’s Section Assembly convener (2016-2019) and as a Fulbright distinguished chair of anthropology at Palacký University, Olomouc, in the Czech Republic. Most recently, he has been the president of the Kent State University Retirees’ Association and serves on the executive boards of the Association of Senior Anthropologists.

== Published works ==
- Kent State University provides a complete list of publications.

== Recognition ==
- 2019: Named Fulbright Distinguished Chair of Anthropology at Palacký University Olomouc in the Czech Republic.
