= Cyclone Yasa =

Category 5 South Pacific cyclone in 2020

Severe Tropical Cyclone Yasa
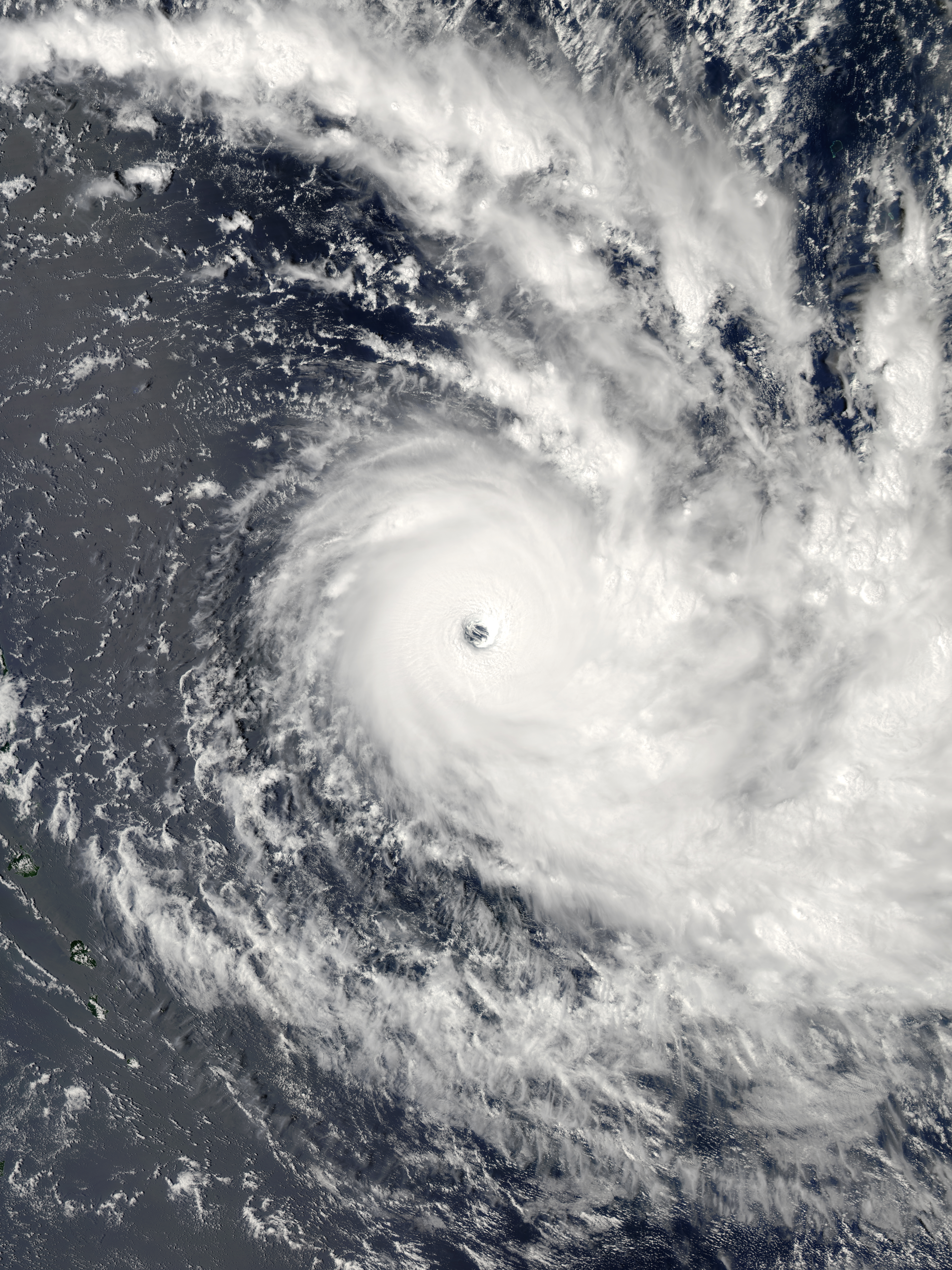
- Cyclone Yasa near peak intensity on 16 December

Meteorological history
- Formed: 11 December 2020
- Subtropical: 19 December 2020
- Dissipated: 24 December 2020

Category 5 severe tropical cyclone
- 10-minute sustained (FMS)
- Highest winds: 230 km/h (145 mph)
- Lowest pressure: 917 hPa (mbar); 27.08 inHg

Category 5-equivalent tropical cyclone
- 1-minute sustained (SSHWS/JTWC)
- Highest winds: 260 km/h (160 mph)
- Lowest pressure: 914 hPa (mbar); 26.99 inHg

Overall effects
- Fatalities: 4
- Missing: 1
- Damage: $245 million (2020 USD)
- Areas affected: Vanuatu; Fiji; Tonga
- IBTrACS
- Part of the 2020–21 South Pacific cyclone season

Severe Tropical Cyclone Yasa was the second Category 5 severe tropical cyclone in 2020 after Harold in the 2019–20 South Pacific cyclone season. Yasa was the second tropical disturbance, as well as the first tropical cyclone and severe tropical cyclone of the 2020–21 South Pacific cyclone season. Yasa was first noted as an area of low pressure to the north of Port Vila in Vanuatu during 10 December. Over the next few days, the system gradually developed further as it absorbed Tropical Depression 01F, before it was classified as a tropical cyclone and named Yasa by the Fiji Meteorological Service on 13 December.

The system gradually moved through the South Pacific Ocean, going through a small, slow loop whilst rapidly intensifying. In about a day, it became a Category 5 severe tropical cyclone on the Australian scale and a few hours later, a Category 5-equivalent cyclone on the Saffir-Simpson scale, with 1-minute sustained winds of 260 km/h (160 mph) and a minimum pressure of 917 hPa (27.1 inHg). This made Yasa the earliest Category 5 tropical cyclone on both the Australian and Saffir-Simpson scales in the South Pacific basin since reliable records began, beating the old record by Zoe in 2002–03.

Yasa maintained its intensity and became more defined on satellite imagery as it bore down on Fiji. An address was sent to the entire country from the nation's Prime Minister Frank Bainimarama regarding preparations for the storm. Shipping services were halted, and fishermen were advised to not go out into sea, due to fears of Yasa possibly injuring or killing them. Multiple warnings were issued, including heavy rain, heavy wind, and flood warnings. Soon, the entirety of Fiji was under warnings as Yasa neared. A high wind warning was put in place for Vanuatu as the storm's wind field reached the country. Impacts began to be felt on mid-day 16 December, as villages in the Malolo and Yasawa groups began to feel the winds and rain of Yasa. The impacts felt from Yasa were large and wide. As of 22 December, impacted areas are beginning to restore communication. Transportation was hampered as 72 roads in the country were closed due to fallen trees, power lines, and flooding. Heavy rain was recorded in most of the country. Four deaths were confirmed, while one person remains missing. Damage in Fiji were calculated at FJ$500 million, or $245 million (2020 USD).

Many affected people had their access to food and water cut off following Yasa's passage through Fiji. The International Federation of Red Cross and Red Crescent Societies provided funding and relief items to about 17,700 Fijians by 18 December, and provided the Fijian Ministry of Health and Medical Services with supplies. Australia pledged its assistance and sent HMAS Adelaide to help with recovery efforts.

== Meteorological history ==
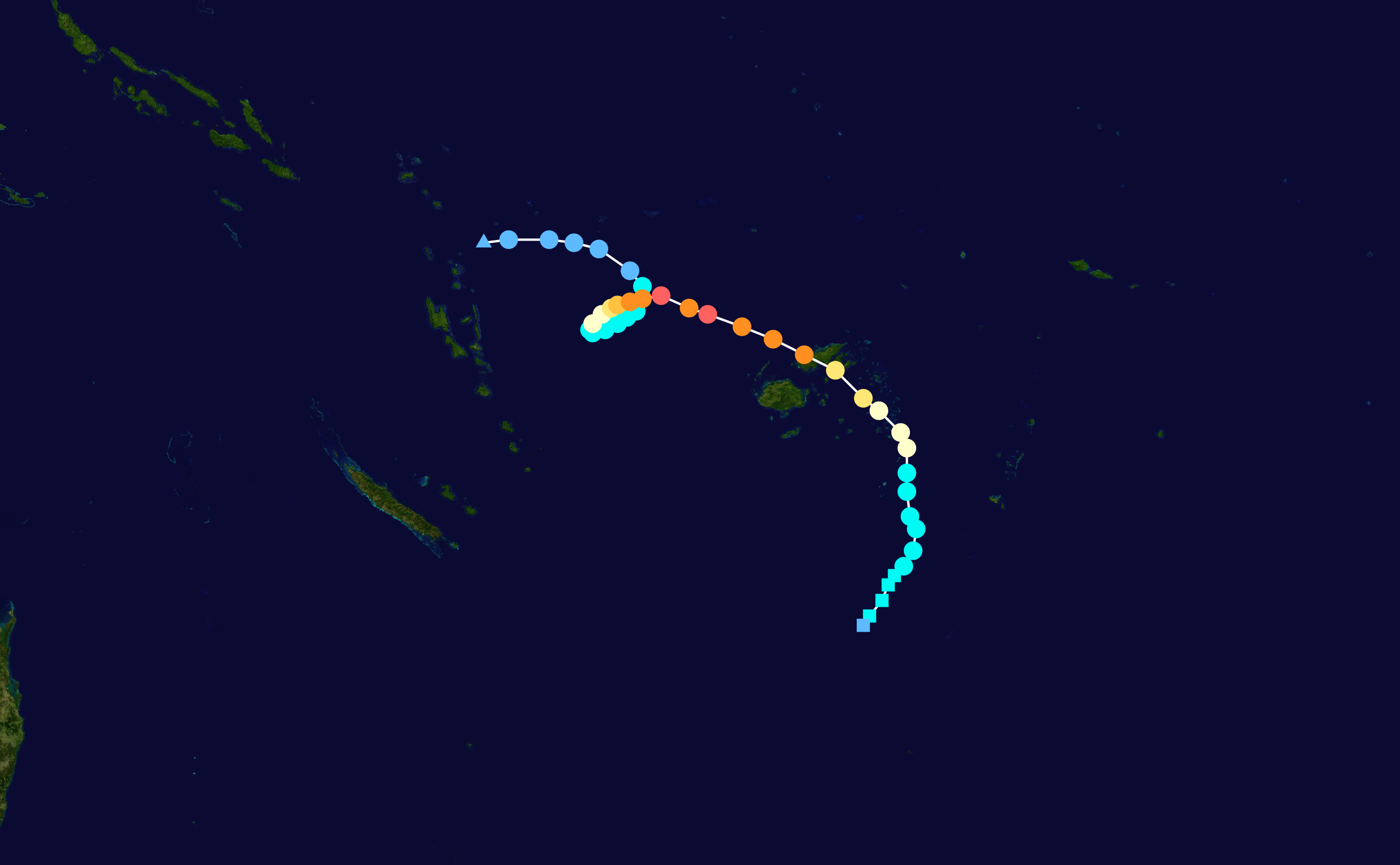
Map plotting the storm's track and intensity, according to the Saffir–Simpson scale Map key Saffir–Simpson scale Tropical depression (≤38 mph, ≤62 km/h) Tropical storm (39–73 mph, 63–118 km/h) Category 1 (74–95 mph, 119–153 km/h) Category 2 (96–110 mph, 154–177 km/h) Category 3 (111–129 mph, 178–208 km/h) Category 4 (130–156 mph, 209–251 km/h) Category 5 (≥157 mph, ≥252 km/h) Unknown Storm type Tropical cyclone Subtropical cyclone Extratropical cyclone, remnant low, tropical disturbance, or monsoon depression

The area of low pressure that would eventually become Severe Tropical Cyclone Yasa was first noted by the United States Joint Typhoon Warning Center (JTWC) during 10 December, while it was located about 655 km (405 mi) to the north of Port Vila in Vanuatu. At this stage, the disturbance had a broad and fully exposed low level circulation, with little to no atmospheric convection surrounding the system. The system was also located within a marginally favourable environment for further development, with high levels of vertical wind shear, being offset by warm sea surface temperatures of around 29–30 °C (84–86 °F). During that day, the system gradually organized further as it moved south-eastwards, before it was classified as Tropical Disturbance 02F by the Fiji Meteorological Service (FMS) during 11 December. During that day, the system continued to develop and was classified as a tropical depression by the FMS, while Tropical Depression 01F/04P moved along its southern periphery. The JTWC subsequently initiated advisories on the system and classified it as Tropical Cyclone 05P during 12 December. Over the next day, the system continued to consolidate and absorbed Tropical Depression 01F, as it moved south-westwards along the northeastern edge of a subtropical ridge of high pressure.

During 13 December, the FMS classified the system as a Category 1 tropical cyclone on the Australian tropical cyclone intensity scale and named it Yasa, while it was located over open waters between Fiji and Vanuatu. After it had been named, Yasa made a small anti-cyclonic loop, while its overall organisation improved significantly, with a compact eye feature appearing on microwave imagery. As a result, the FMS reported that the system had intensified into a Category 2 tropical cyclone, while the JTWC reported that Yasa had become equivalent to a Category 1 hurricane on the Saffir–Simpson hurricane wind scale (SSHWS). Yasa subsequently performed a second anti-cyclonic loop as the subtropical ridge weakened, while its primary steering mechanism started to change, which caused the system to move north-eastwards towards the Equator. During 14 December, the FMS reported that Yasa had become a Category 3 severe tropical cyclone, before the system rapidly intensified into a Category 4 severe tropical cyclone later that day.

During 15 December, Yasa continued to rapidly intensify with its eye becoming well defined, before the FMS reported that the system had become the earliest Category 5 severe tropical cyclone on record. The system subsequently turned south-eastwards as a subtropical ridge of high pressure built in from the cyclones southeast before a ridge of high pressure near the equator caused the system to start moving south-eastwards towards Fiji.

The JTWC reported that Yasa had peaked with 1-minute sustained wind speeds of 260 km/h (160 mph), which made it equivalent to a Category 5 hurricane on the SSHWS during 16 December. Later that day, the FMS reported that Yasa had peaked with maximum 10-minute sustained winds of 230 km/h (140 mph), as well as a minimum pressure of 917 hPa (27.08 inHg), although it was operationally assessed at 250 km/h (160 mph), and a minimum pressure of 899 hPa (26.55 inHg). The system subsequently started to weaken with its cloud tops starting to warm before Yasa made landfall in Bua Province on Vanua Levu as a Category 5 severe tropical cyclone, at around 06:00 UTC (18:00 FJT) on 17 December.

After it had made landfall, Yasa's eye became cloud-filled and dissipated, as it completed an eyewall replacement cycle over Vanua Levu. The system subsequently moved into the Koro Sea, where it passed near or over several of the Lau Islands and started to interact with an upper-level trough of low pressure. This caused increased vertical wind shear over the system, which in turn caused Yasa to significantly weaken and become a Category 3 severe tropical cyclone during 18 December. Over the next couple of days, the system gradually weakened further, as it brushed Tonga, before it was classified as a former tropical cyclone by the FMS during 19 December as it degenerated into an extratropical low. Over the next few days, the JTWC continued to monitor Yasa as a subtropical cyclone, before the system was last noted during 24 December.

== Preparations ==
=== Fiji ===
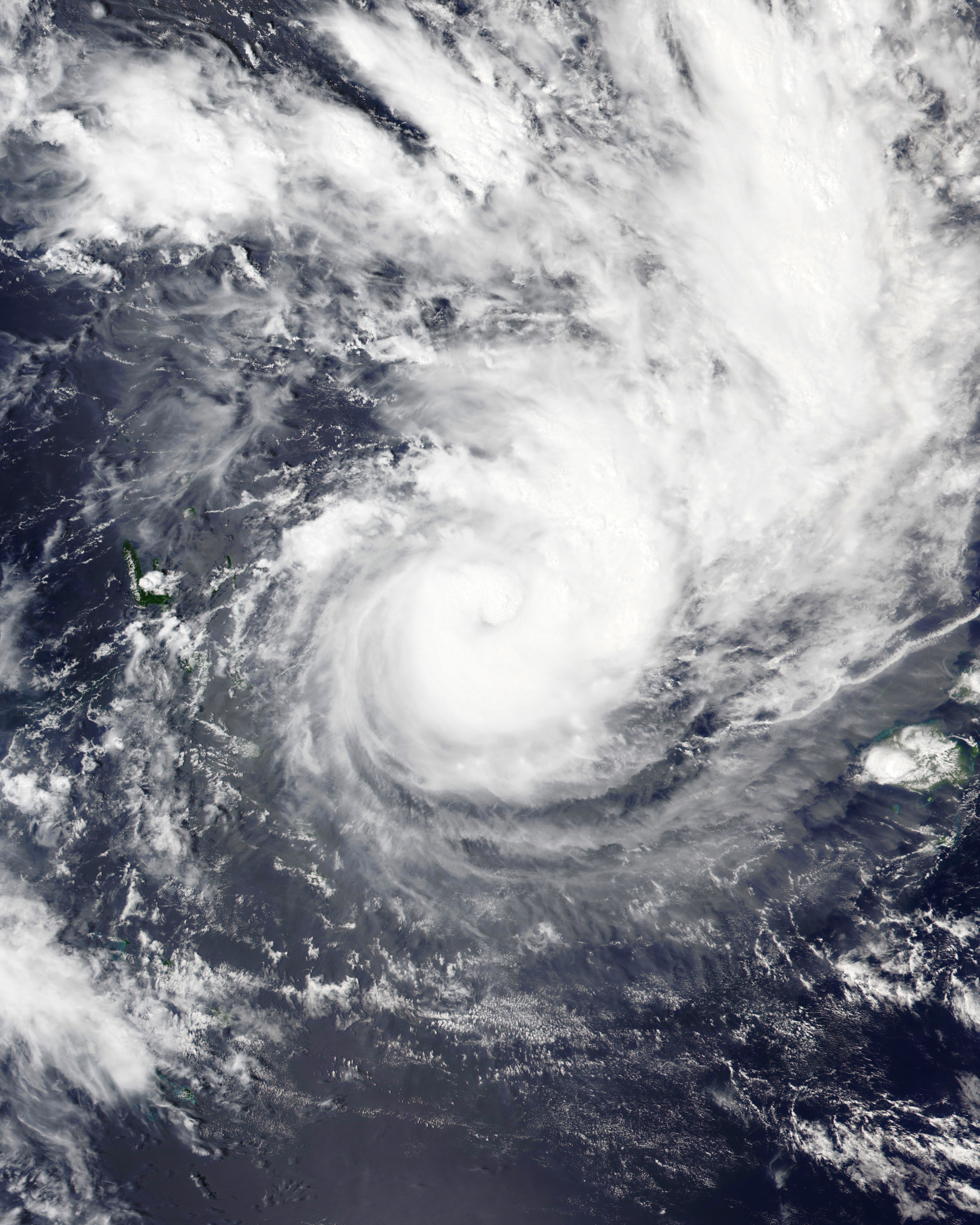
Yasa strengthening east of Vanuatu early on 14 December

During 11 December, the FMS issued a gale warning for Rotuma, as Tropical Depression 01F was expected to impact the Fijian dependency, with wind gusts of up to 60 km/h (35 mph). They also noted that the system was expected, to produce very rough to high seas, heavy rain and sea flooding of low-lying coastal areas. This warning was subsequently expanded during the following day to include Tropical Depression 02F and an associated convergence zone. The warning was cancelled during 13 December, after 02F had merged with 01F and developed into a tropical cyclone. Over the next few days, strong wind, heavy rain and flood warnings were issued for various parts of the archipelago, before a tropical cyclone alert was issued during 15 December, for Rotuma, Viti Levu, Vanua Levu as well as the Yasawa and Mamanuca island groups. Later that day, the alert was expanded to include the whole of Fiji, while gale warnings were issued for the Yasawa and Mamanuca island groups, Viti Levu and Vanua Levu. Over the next few days, various gale, storm, hurricane, storm surge and damaging swell warnings were issued for the group.

On 16 December, shipping services were halted and the Ministry of Fisheries strongly advised fishermen to refrain from travelling out to sea. The Ministry of Education, Heritage and Arts ordered the closure of all schools as schools would be used as evacuation centers and an Emergency Operations Center was activated by the National Disaster Management Office. The Fiji Police Force activated its Cyclone Response Operation with police officers deployed around the country with necessary resources. Prime Minister Frank Bainimarama in a video address urged all Fijians to prepare for the cyclone. The National Disaster Management Office posted on social media that storm surges with waves as high as 16 m (52 ft) were expected. Fiji Airways said that its larger aircraft will either operate repatriation services to Sydney, Auckland, Los Angeles and Hong Kong, or be ferried to Sydney or Auckland in the next two days. The aircraft will remain at those airports to avoid storm damage. Evacuation centers were opened nationwide and the government put the military on standby to help. On 17 December, a nationwide curfew was enacted starting at 4:00 p.m local time and the National Disaster Management Office declared a state of emergency.

Early on 17 December, Bainimarama said in a video posted to Facebook that over 850,000 Fijians, or about 95% of the country's population, were in the direct path of Yasa. He added that weather forecasts anticipated "severe coastal inundation", with waves up to 10 meters high. Police enforced a public ban on public transport. The state of natural disaster that was declared gave law enforcement increased power.

=== Elsewhere ===
As the storm began to impact Vanuatu, a strong wind warning was put in effect for central and southern coastal areas of the country.

As Yasa passed to the west of Tonga on 18 December, tropical cyclone warnings were raised for the entirety of the country. Officials warned of winds up to hurricane force on Tongatapu and ʻEua. Other regions of the country were forecast to experience torrential rainfall, swells up to 6 meters high, and violent storm force winds throughout the day.

== Impact ==
=== Fiji ===
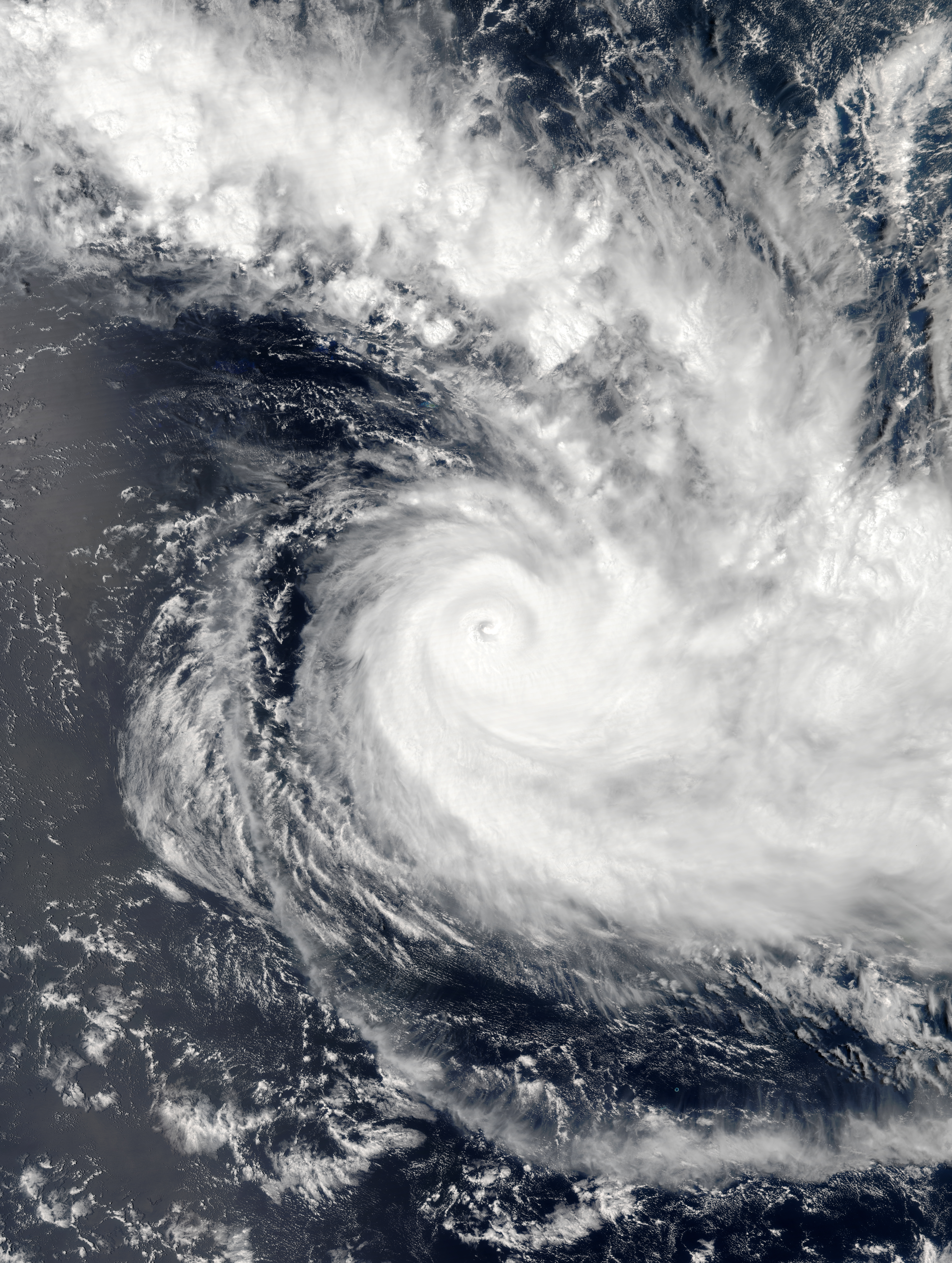
Yasa nearing landfall on 17 December

As Yasa moved across Fiji, a village elder in Yasawa stated that some of their farms had been destroyed. Parts of Rakiraki and Labasa were flooded. The cyclone struck Vanua Levu destroying homes in Tabia, Vunivau, Dreketi and Nabouwalu. Dreketi Primary School and other schools in Vanua Levu were severely damaged. Communications from impacted areas were lost on 17 December. A total of 72 roads were closed around the country as a result of fallen trees, broken powerlines, floodwaters and landslides. In Belego Savusavu, 15 homes were destroyed and water and electricity supply was disrupted. Parts of Bua were inaccessible due to fallen trees, landslides and damaged roads. Massive landslides occurred along the Dreketi-Nabouwalu Highway. According to FBC News, Labasa, Savusavu, Koro and Ovalau suffered minimal damage. Across Fiji's northern regions, crops were damaged and/or destroyed. In Kubulau Bua, strong winds and heavy rains that lasted for more than 6 hours (longer than Winston) destroyed about 60 houses. A 45-year-old man and an infant in Labasa were killed when a home collapsed. More than 93,000 Fijians – over 10% of the population – were impacted by the storm, and around 23,000 were required to go to evacuation centers. Over 4,200 houses were damaged or destroyed. Prime Minister Frank Bainimarama stated that the damage would likely surpass that of Cyclone Winston in 2016, additionally tweeting that "This is not normal. This is a climate emergency." Reports showed that much of the homes in villages were completely destroyed and crops were flattened by the extensive wind brought in by Yasa. As with many disasters during the COVID-19 pandemic, recovery was anticipated to be much harder and slower due to restrictions and measures still needed to be taken while thousands remained in evacuation centers.

A damage survey performed in February 2021 indicated that the total damage reached FJ$500 million (US$245 million), in which FJ$147 million (US$72.1 million) was agricultural damage. A total of 2,141 homes completely destroyed and another 6,184 partially damaged.

=== Tonga ===
Since Yasa took a slightly more western track than anticipated, much of the country of Tonga was left spared by the cyclone. The Island of Vavaʻu reported minor damage to fruit crops and Kava plants. Around 90 in quarantine due to COVID-19 at a camp in Vaini, Tongatapu were required to be evacuated to Fua'amotu (a remote village in Nukuʻalofa) due to Yasa.

== Aftermath ==
Shortly after Yasa made landfall in Fiji, the International Federation of Red Cross and Red Crescent Societies (IFRC) released information on initial emergency relief funds for the storm. The funds of 86,000 Swiss Francs ($97,000 USD), were used to provide first aid, shelter materials, tarpaulins, hygiene kits, household items, and safe water to more than 17,700 people. The Ministry of Health and Medical Services was provided with Inter-Agency Emergency Health Kits, and other medical and health supplies. Many WASH kits, school in a boxes, and school boxes were stored at a warehouse in Brisbane, Australia, to be sent to Fiji. Meanwhile, some of the same supplies were prepositioned in Fiji ahead of the storm. A Royal New Zealand Air Force reconnaissance flight flew over the areas affected to further assess damage; the disaster zone was compared to that of a "war zone". The Australian Minister for Foreign Affairs Marise Payne released a statement on 19 December pledging that Australia would provide emergency humanitarian relief in whatever capacity possible with their condolences and thoughts with every person effected by the cyclone. Payne further affirmed that "Throughout our long history of cooperation, Fiji and Australia have become more than just neighbors – we are family. [...] Australia pledges our ongoing support to our Fijian vuvale following TC Yasa." Australia's HMAS Adelaide, carrying personnel from the Australian Army's 6th Engineering Support Regiment and equipment was sent to assist Fiji in its recovery efforts.

Many families across affected areas lost access to food, and were left without it just before the Christmas season. Waves higher than 3 meters (9.8 feet) prevented ships from leaving Suva, on the island of Viti Levu. The environmental NGO 350 in Fiji's secretary, Genevieve Jiva, said that Fijians are "literally fighting for our survival" after the storm's passing.

=== Retirement ===
Due to its onslaught, the name Yasa was retired from the naming list and was replaced by Yabaki.

== See also ==
- Tropical cyclones in 2020
- Cyclone Susan – Another powerful cyclone that formed in December.
- Cyclone Harold – Also severely impacted Vanuatu and Fiji on the same year.
- Cyclone Zoe – The second-most powerful cyclone in the basin, the most intense in December on record in the basin.
- Cyclone Winston – Most powerful tropical cyclone in the basin, also severely impacted Fiji.
- Cyclone Tino – Another tropical cyclone that made landfall near same areas in the same year.
- Cyclone Ana – Strong tropical cyclone that also made landfall in Fiji a month and a half later
