= Fatutaka =

Island in Solomon Islands

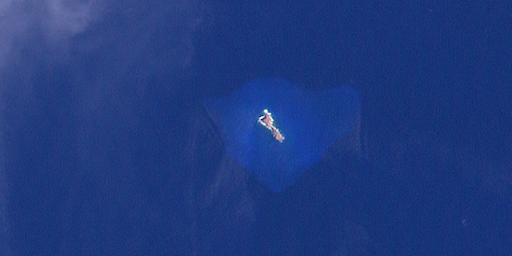
Landsat image of Fatutaka

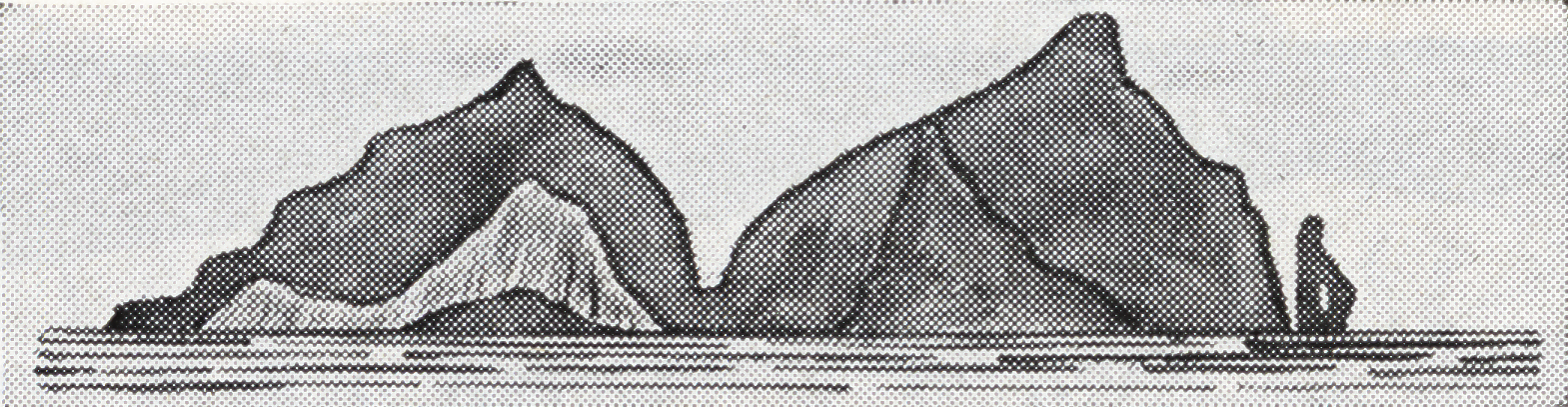
1943 drawing of the island, as seen from the east at a distance of 12 km

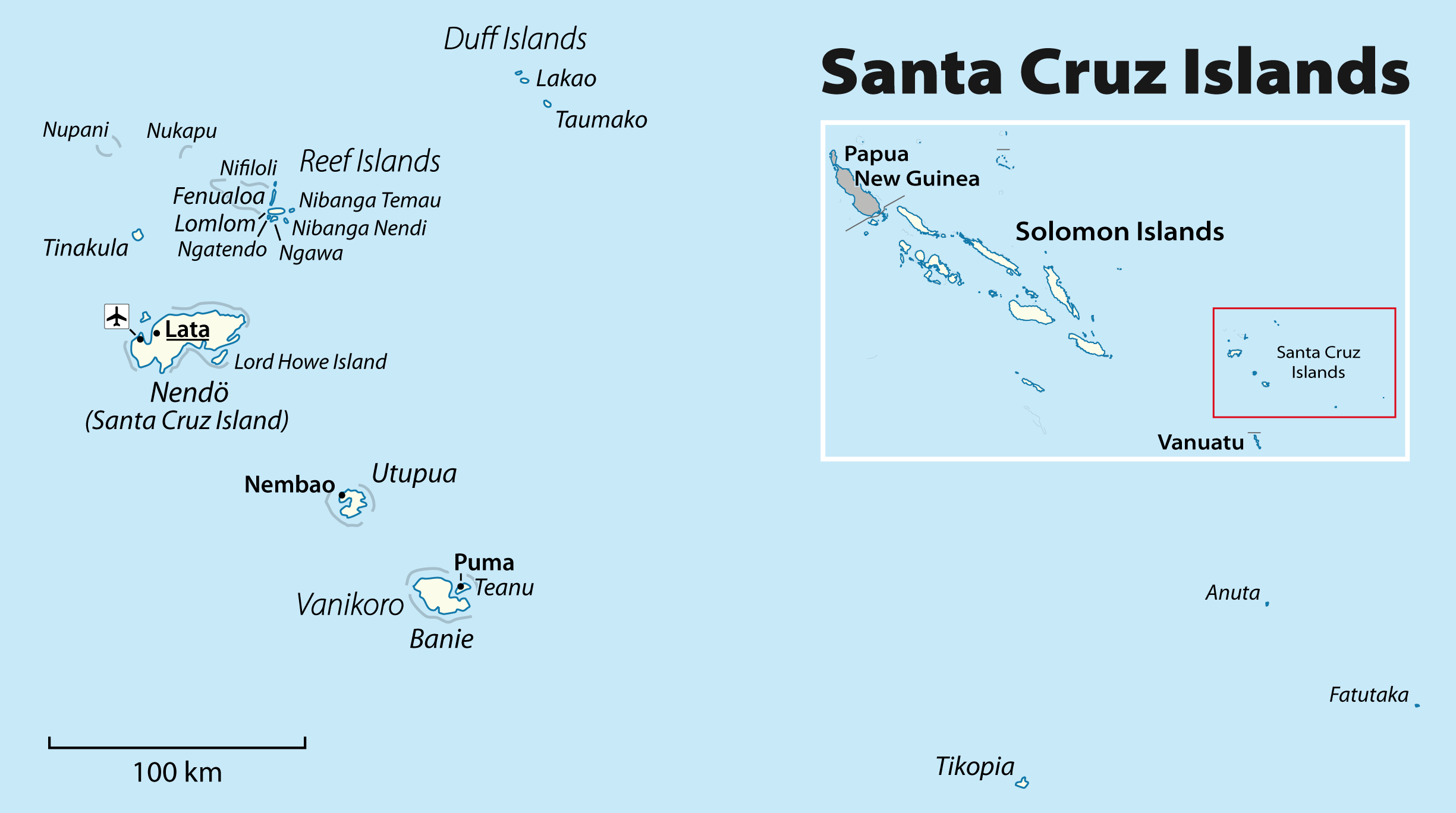

Fatutaka, Fatu Taka or Patu Taka (also known as Fataka and Mitre Island) is a small volcanic island in Temotu Province, in the nation of Solomon Islands, south-west Pacific Ocean. The easternmost island in Solomon Islands, Fatutaka is located c. 32 km (20 mi) southeast of Anuta and can be seen from there in clear weather. Fatutaka and Anuta were discovered for Europeans by Admiral Edward Edwards in 1791.

The island, located at 11°54′36″S 170°11′24″E, is a small rocky outcropping, rising to an elevation of 122 m (400 ft). The total land area of the island is 18 ha (44 acres).

== Human activities ==
The island's soil is rocky, and not especially fertile, although it has in the past been used as a gardening location for the people of Anuta.

The population of Anuta, the closest inhabited island, regularly sail to Fatutaka to eat and collect sea-birds and their eggs. The birds of Fatukaka have never been surveyed although the presence of Frigatebird, Eastern Reef Egret, Pacific Imperial Pigeon, and Emerald Dove have been reported.

== Geology ==
Fatutaka is one of numerous volcanic highs, islands and banks, in the north-western North Fiji Basin south of the fossil Vitiaz Trench (10°30'–19°S, 169°–174°E). These highs are, however, located up to 240 km (150 mi) from the Vitiaz Trench and do not form a continuous chain derived from the trench, but are a series of massifs aligned on north–south trending faults. Anuta and Fatutaka consist of basaltic lavas and andesitic breccias.

In the 1970s the formation of Anuta and Fatutaka 2.2 Ma was attributed to volcanism in the Vitiaz island arc during the initial back-arc opening of the North Fiji Basin. The Vitiaz Arc volcanoes were, however, displaced in an earlier episode and the formation of the islands is now attributed to renewed volcanism associated with a change in motion of the Pacific Plate 2 Ma.

== See also ==
- Oceania
- Pacific Islands
- Santa Cruz Islands
