= Anuta =

Island in Solomon Islands

Anuta (Anuda)
Nickname: Cherry Island
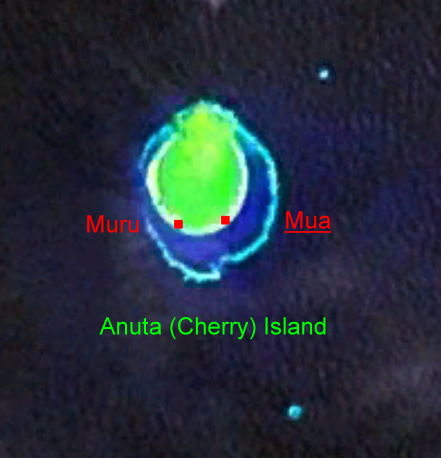
- NASA Satellite Image Geocover 2000

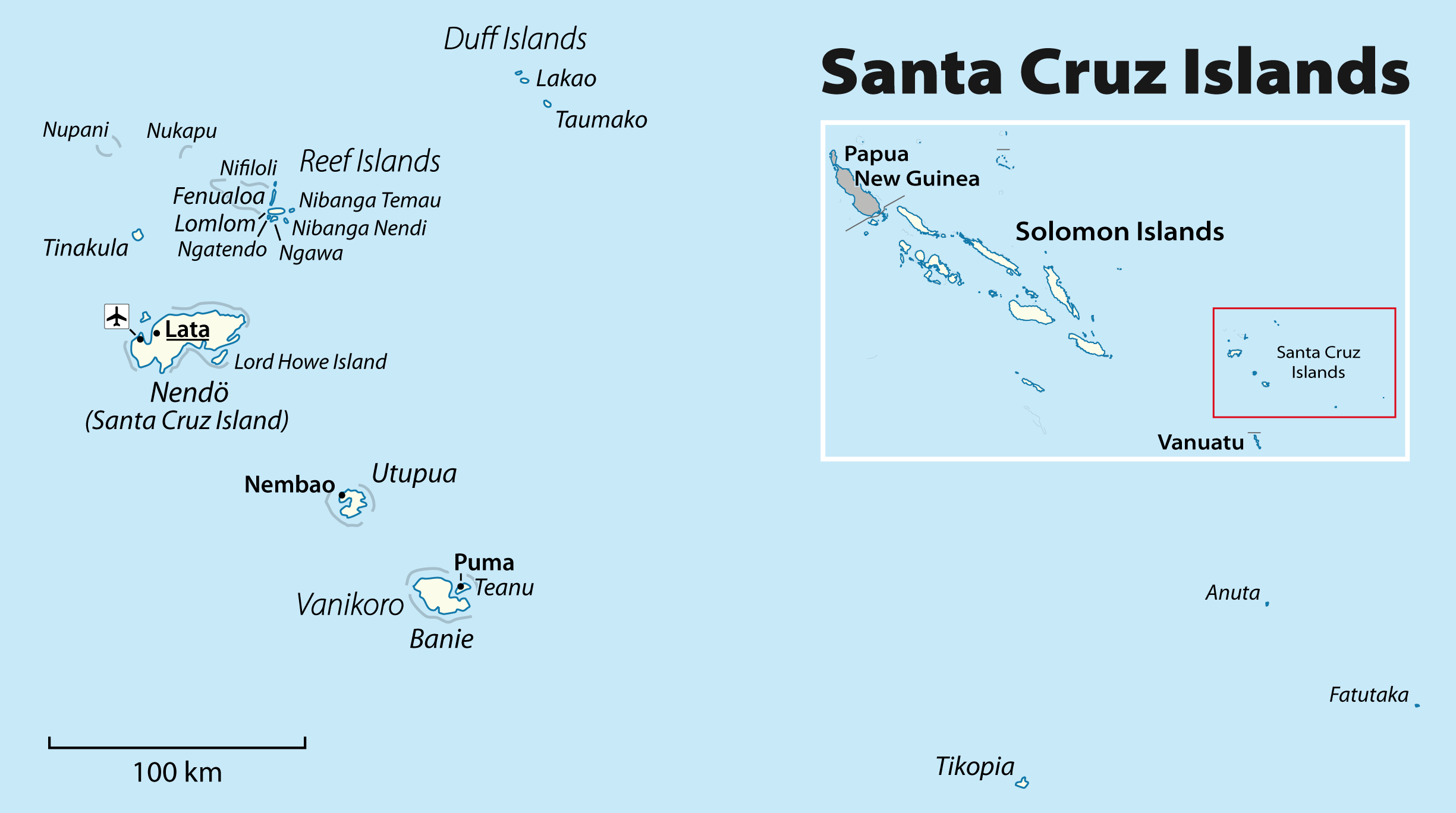
- Santa Cruz Islands overview map

Geography
- Location: Pacific Ocean
- Coordinates: 11°36′39″S 169°51′01″E
- Archipelago: Solomon Islands
- Area: 0.37 km^{2} (0.14 sq mi)
- Length: 0.876 km (0.5443 mi)
- Width: 0.576 km (0.3579 mi)
- Highest elevation: 65 m (213 ft)

Administration
- Solomon Islands
- Province: Temotu
- Largest settlement: Mua (pop. 200)

Demographics
- Population: 300
- Pop. density: 811/km^{2} (2100/sq mi)
- Ethnic groups: Polynesians

Anuta is a small volcanic island in the province of Temotu in the southeastern part of Solomon Islands. It is one of the smallest permanently inhabited Polynesian islands. It is one of the Polynesian Outlier communities in Melanesia.

== Geography ==
Location of Anuta in the Pacific Ocean

The island lies about 500 km (310 mi) to the east-southeast of Nendö. It is a small volcanic island with a fringing coral reef. The highest point on the island is 65 m (213 ft) above sea level. The island has a diameter of only about 750 m (820 yd) and an area of 0.4 square kilometres (0.15 sq mi).

The island lies halfway between the Solomon Islands archipelago and Tuvalu. Anuta's nearest populated neighbour is Tikopia Island, about 112 kilometres (70 mi) to the southwest. The next closest islands are Vanikolo, Utupua, and the Reef Islands—with mixed Melanesian and Polynesian populations—and the Duff Islands, all over 320 kilometres (200 mi) away. Further southwest lie the Banks and New Hebrides Groups.

== History ==
Anuta was first mentioned in 1791, and the political and geographical circumstances led to isolation of Anuta's population.

According to oral traditions, Anuta was settled by voyagers from Tonga and 'Uvea about fifteen generations ago. The time frame of the migration is not precisely identified but is understood to be some time between the 10th century and the mid-13th century, although the arrival of the voyagers in Anuta could have occurred later. The pattern of settlement that is believed to have occurred is that the Polynesians spread out from Tonga and other islands in the central and southeastern Pacific islands.

During pre-European-contact times, there was frequent canoe voyaging between the islands, because Polynesian navigation skills are recognised to have allowed deliberate journeys on double-hull sailing canoes or outrigger canoes. The voyagers moved into the Tuvaluan atolls, with Tuvalu providing a stepping-stone to migration into the Polynesian Outlier communities in Melanesia and Micronesia.

One of the Tongan settlers, Pu Kaurave, became the first chief, and was succeeded by his son Ruokimata. When Ruokimata died without an heir, Taroaki, one of the 'Uvean arrivals, became the next chief. Further arrivals from Samoa and Tonga occurred two generations after the initial settlers. The current social structure was established in the sixth generation when chief Tearakura, his two brothers, and one brother-in-law slew the remainder of the island's male population. These men, along with Tearakura's two sisters, were founders of the island's four kainanga, large descent groups that are sometimes described in English as 'clans'. Another group arrived from Rotuma some time later.

Anglican missionaries arrived in 1916, quickly converting the entire island. During the 1990s, Anuta's advisers rejected western medicines on the island, arguing that it would indicate a lack of faith in the church. Administratively, Anuta is part of the Anglican Church of Melanesia Diocese of Temotu.

In December 2002, the island was impacted by Cyclone Zoe.

== Society and culture ==
Anuta has a human population of about 300. This is one of the highest population densities in the world, perhaps equalling that of Bangladesh.

The island has two systems for naming villages (noporanga, or "dwelling places"). In one system there are three villages called Mua, Muri, and St. John. Mua, meaning "front", is to the east. Muri, meaning "back" is west of Mua. After establishment of the Anglican church in 1916, a third village grew up to the west of Muri and took the name of the church, St. John. In the second system, Mua and Muri are combined under the name, Rotoapi, and contrasted with the new village which, in the second system, is called Vatiana. Anutans use the uninhabited island of Fatutaka, about 60 km (37 mi) to the southeast, as a place to hunt birds.

Anuta has preserved its canoe culture through the ages. The island with its population of just 300 has around 70 traditional dugout canoes of a very beautiful and specific V-eed hull design. The canoes are used in rotation with about 5-6 canoes in daily use for fishing at a time. After a few weeks they are checked and repaired and carefully stored among the houses in the villages under a cover of palm leaves. This method of usage has preserved the canoes for a very long time. They still have two large canoes built around the 1880s by a famous canoe builder, Pu Auekofe, who also built the Sacred Tikopia Canoe (Vaka Tapu) on display in Auckland War Memorial Museum (donated in 1916 to the bishop of Auckland on the island adopting Christianity). There is an even older canoe still in occasional use built two generations earlier, so probably in around 1820-30. This canoe is built with stone and shell tools and has beautiful carvings on its surface. This canoe has great significance as it was built before the first Westerners briefly visited the island and hence is of a design without Western influence. Its distinctive V-eed hull shape indicates good windward sailing ability and is proof that early Polynesian migrations would have been possible against prevailing winds. In 2009 Hanneke Boon, designer of the Polynesian inspired Wharram double canoes and initiator of the 'Lapita Voyage' expedition, arrived in Anuta on Lapita Anuta, a double canoe modeled on the traditional Anuta & Tikopia canoe hull shape. This canoe was donated to the island for long distance, independent transport. She video recorded this oldest canoe and made studies of the other canoes.

=== Language ===
Anutans speak the Anuta language (locally te taranga paka-Anuta), which is related to other Polynesian languages.

=== Relationship with environment ===
An important value in Anutan society is aropa, which emphasizes collaboration, sharing and compassion for others. The concept of aropa encourages islanders to share their finite resources equitably. Because Anuta's high population density has not had a severely negative impact on the island's ecosystem, Anuta has attracted interest from scientists interested in sustainability. The BBC documentary series South Pacific devotes part of the episode 1, Ocean of Islands, to the ability of Anutans to maintain their island's bounty, contrasting it with the environmental destruction found on Easter Island.

The Anuta people take care to fulfil their needs with respect to the environment, to preserve it. At certain times they do not catch certain fish or hunt animals.

=== Social life ===
Like most of the other Polynesian islands, Anuta has traditions of choral polyphonic singing. Free time is spent dancing, singing and swimming.

== Research and media exposure ==
Anthropologist Raymond Firth visited Anuta for a day in 1952. Ethnobotanist Douglas Yen, along with archaeologists Patrick Kirch and Paul Rosendahl, spent about two months there in 1971, and anthropologist Richard Feinberg lived on Anuta for almost a year in 1972–1973. He has remained in communication with the Anutan community from that time onward and has made several additional visits.

A number of documentaries about Anuta have been created. In January 2005 Italian documentarists Elisabetta (Lizzi) Eordegh and Carlo Auriemma sailed aboard the sailing boat Barca Pulita with a crew of four (including two doctors) and visited the island for one week. In 2006, Bruce Parry of the BBC visited for several weeks, during which he and his team filmed an episode of the TV show, Tribe. In 2008, a BBC researcher made a brief visit in preparation for the Lapita Voyage Expedition, of which an independent documentary was produced in 2010 by Hanneke Boon. Terra X a German TV channel also produced a documentary about this expedition Wagnis in der Südsee. In 2012 a team from the Seoul Broadcasting System filmed a TV show there for a Korean audience. In 2013, the team and crew of the Canadian documentary 1000 jours pour la planète arrived on the island with the anthropologist Richard Feinberg.

== See also ==
- Austronesian peoples
- Pacific Islands
- Polynesia
- Polynesian outlier
- Solomon Islands
