= List of airports in Tuvalu =

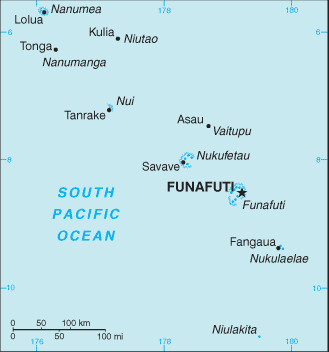
Map of Tuvalu

This is a list of airports in Tuvalu.

Tuvalu, formerly known as the Ellice Islands, is a Polynesian island country located in the Pacific Ocean, midway between Hawaii and Australia. Its nearest neighbours are Kiribati, Nauru, Samoa and Fiji. It comprises four reef islands and five true atolls. Its population of 10,507 (2017 Census) makes it among the least-populated sovereign states in the world. In terms of physical land size, at just 26 square kilometres (10 sq mi) Tuvalu is the fourth smallest country in the world, larger only than the Vatican City at 0.44 km^{2} (0.17 sq mi), Monaco at 1.95 km^{2} (0.75 sq mi) and Nauru at 21 km^{2} (8.1 sq mi).

== Airports ==
Island served	ICAO	IATA	Airport name	Coordinates
Funafuti	NGFU	FUN	Funafuti International Airport	8°31′30″S 179°11′47″E
Nanumea			Nanumea Airfield (abandoned after World War II)	5°40′S 176°07′E
Motulalo, Nukufetau			Nukufetau Airfield (abandoned after World War II)	8°30′S 178°30′E

== History ==
Funafuti Airfield was built by United States Navy Seabee construction battalions in 1943 during World War II. It was later sealed to create Funafuti International Airport.

During World War II, the American forces also built airfields on Nanumea and Motulalo, which is the largest atoll of Nukufetau. After the war these two airfields were dismantled.

== See also ==
- Transport in Tuvalu
- List of airports by ICAO code: N#NG - Kiribati (Gilbert Islands), Tuvalu
- Wikipedia:WikiProject Aviation/Airline destination lists: Oceania#Tuvalu
