= Motuloa (north of Nukufetau) =

Motulua
- Location in Nukufetau

Geography
- Location: South Pacific
- Coordinates: 7.9531°S 178.4222°E

Administration
- Tuvalu

Motuloa or Motulua is a very small island on the north of Nukufetau in Tuvalu. It is an oval with a length of 200 m, and lies between Teafuanonu (on the west) and Teafuaniua (on the east).

== See also ==
- Islands of Tuvalu
- Motuloa
- Savave
