= Entrance Island =

Entrance Island may refer to:

- Entrance Island (British Columbia)
- Entrance Island (Tasmania)
- Entrance Island (South Australia)
- Entrance Island (New Zealand), in Lake Te Anau
- Entrance Island (Queensland)
- Teafuaono or Entrance Island, Nukufetau, Tuvalu
