= OUA =

OUA or Oua may refer to:

== Organisations ==
- Open Universities Australia, an online higher education organization based in Australia
- Organisation of African Unity, now replaced by the African Union
- Ontario University Athletics, a regional membership association for Canadian universities

== Places ==
- Oua, an island in Tuvalu
- Oua River, a river in Gabon
- ʻOʻua, an island in Tonga
- Ouagadougou Airport (IATA code)
