= Kongo Loto Lafanga =

- Location in Nukufetau

Geography
- Location: South Pacific
- Coordinates: 7.9882°S 178.4223°E

Administration
- Tuvalu

Kongo Loto Lafanga is an islet of Nukufetau, Tuvalu, which is south of Lafanga islet in the North East of Nukufetau atoll.
