= Motumua =

Island in Nukufetau atoll, Tuvalu

Coordinates: 8°02′S 178°19′E

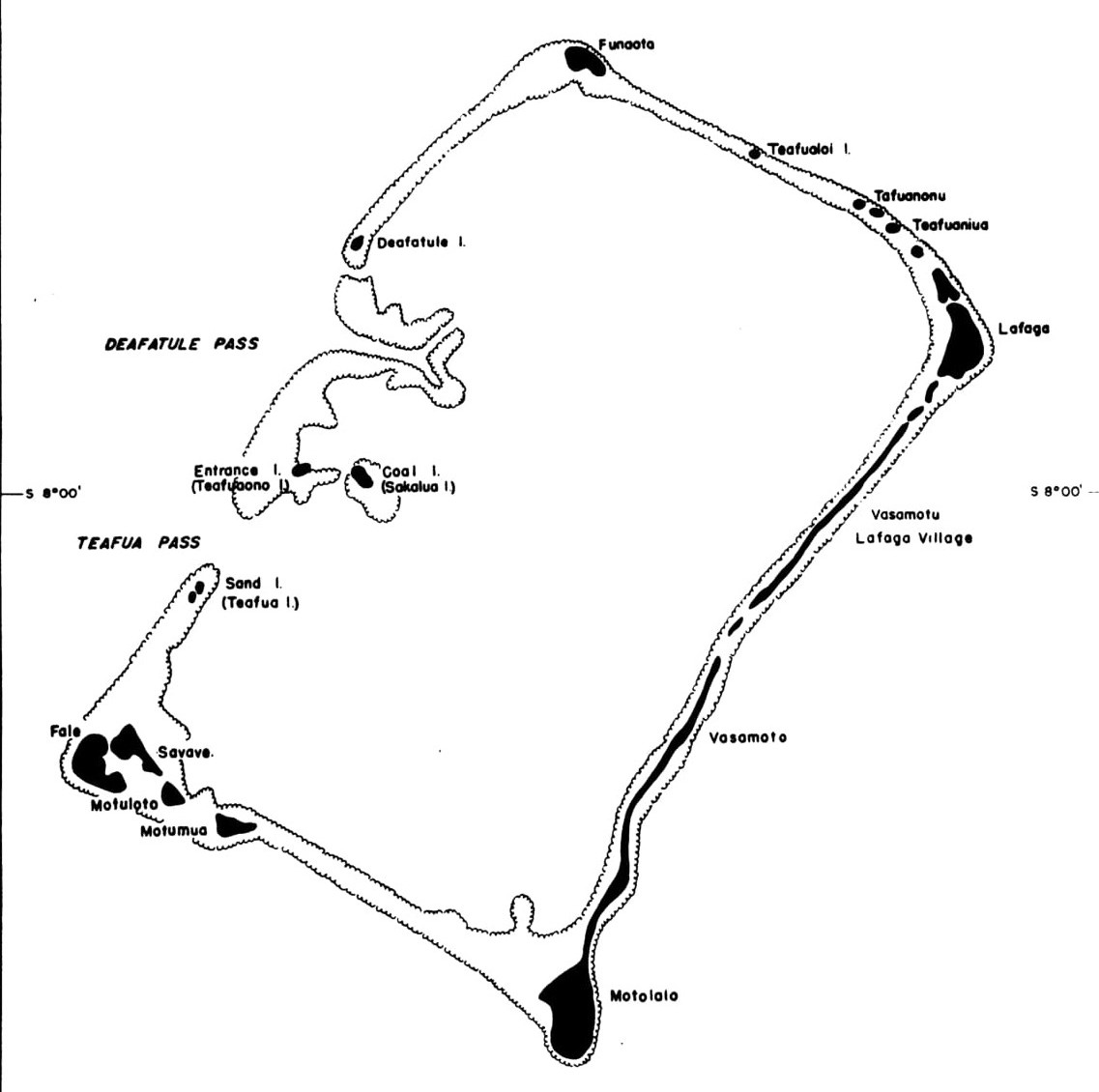
Map of Nukufetau; Motumua is located on the bottom left

Motumua is an islet of Nukufetau, Tuvalu to the east of Fale islet. On 11 February 1947 the community of Nukufetau opened a boarding school on Motumua so that the children of the island could get an education. The school continued until 1951 when the Education Department requested that it be transferred to Savave and become the government primary school for Nukufetau.
