= 17th Antiaircraft Artillery Battalion =

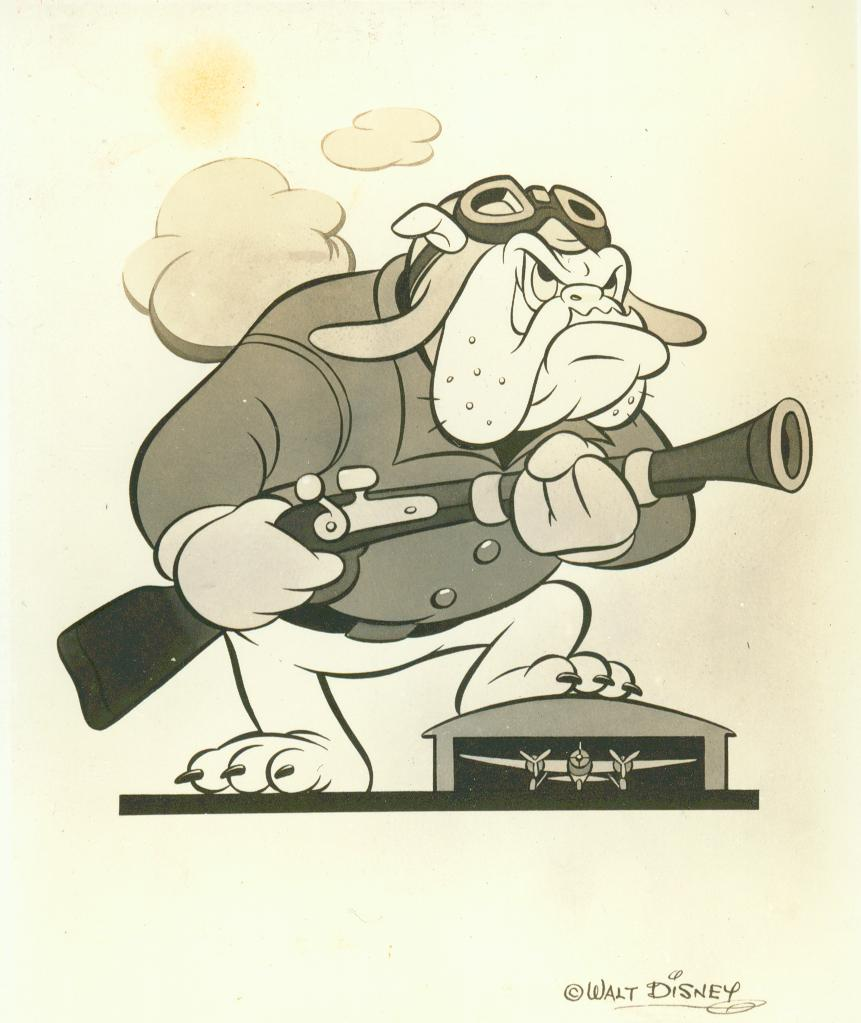
- 17th AAA Battalion insignia
- Active: 28 Oct 1942 – 6 Dec 1945
- Country: United States of America
- Branch: United States Marine Corps
- Type: Air Defense/Coastal Defense
- Size: ~1100 men
- Nickname: Two:Seventeen
- Motto: "One of a Kind"
- Engagements: World War II: Battle of Tarawa; Occupation of Tinian

Commanders
- Current commander: N/A

The 17th Antiaircraft Artillery Battalion (17th AAA Bn) was an antiaircraft unit in the United States Marine Corps that served during World War II. The battalion was originally formed in 1942 as the 2d Airdrome Battalion and has the distinction of being the last defense battalion formed in the Marine Corps during the war. Its original mission was to provide air and coastal defense for advanced naval bases. During the war the battalion spent significant time defending Nukufetau and took part in combat operations at Tarawa and Tinian. The battalion was decommissioned on December 6, 1945.

2d Airdrome Battalion Table of Organization:

- Headquarters and Service Battery
  - Light tank platoon
- 90mm Gun Group
  - 3 x 90mm Gun batteries
- Searchlight Batteries
  - 2 x batteries each w/ six lights
- Special Weapons Group
  - 40mm Battery (w/ 12 guns)
  - 2 x machine gun platoons
    - 12 x .50cal water-cooled antiaircraft guns
    - 12 x .30cal water-cooled antiaircraft guns

== History ==
=== Organization ===
The 2d Airdrome Battalion was commissioned on October 28, 1942 at Camp Linda Vista, San Diego, California. It was one of two airdrome battalions formed by the Marine Corps specifically to defend airfields in the China Burma India Theater. Those airfields were overrun by the Japanese before the battalions deployed, so the Marine Corps quickly changed their tasking to missions in the Pacific Theater. The battalion's table of organization was very similar to that of a defense battalion minus coastal artillery.

The first thirteen men in the battalion came over from the 12th Defense Battalion joining the newly formed Headquarters and Service Battery under the authority of Area General Order 15-42. While organizing and training in Southern California the battalion spent extensive time at Camp Callan, near La Jolla and Camp Dunlap in the Imperial Valley. The 2d Airdrome Battalion departed the United States near the end of May 1943 onboard the USS Henderson (AP-1) and SS Cape Clear (AK-5039).

The battalion arrived in Oahu, Hawaii on May 31, 1943. The battalion remained there for ten weeks of additional training as it waited for initial deployment orders. On August 14, 1943 the battalion embarked on the USS Ormsby (APA-49) and the SS Whistler and sailed west for the Ellice Islands.

=== Nukefetau and Tarawa ===
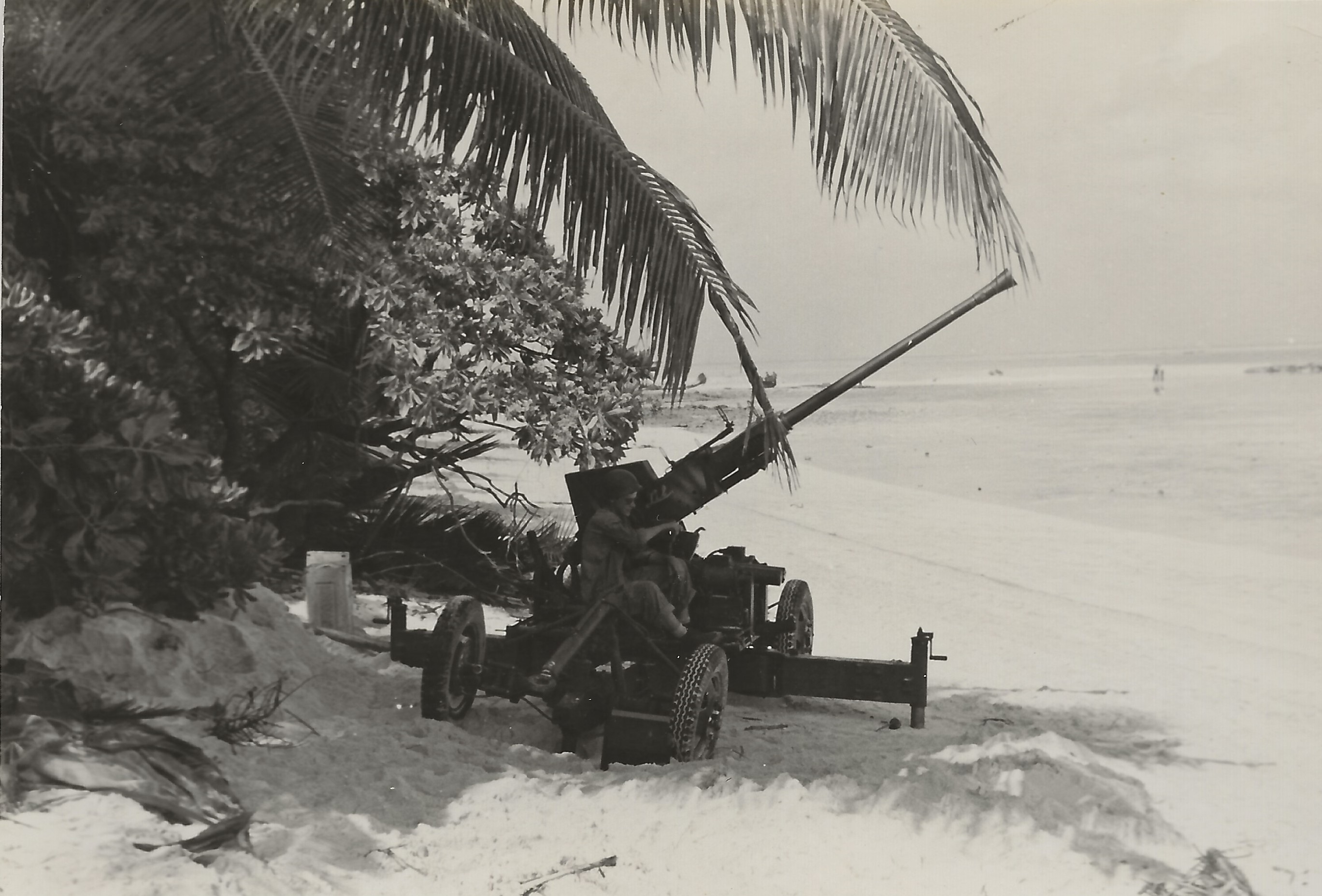
40mm antiaircraft gun from the 2d Airdrome Battalion on the beach at Nukufetau guarding the offload of an LST on August 28, 1943.

Arriving at Funafuti on August 21, the 2d Airdrome Battalion only stayed a few days before moving to Nukufetau on August 25, 1943 along with the first elements of the Navy's 16th Naval Construction Battalion. Nukufetau was a small atoll 75 miles northwest of the airfield that had been established on Funafuti. The battalion was responsible for air defense of the area while the Seabees constructed Nukufetau Airfield. The airfield was opened on October 6, 1943.

Half of the 2d Airdrome Battalion was detached from duty on Nukufetau and sailed for Tarawa. The detachment went ashore four days after the 2nd Marine Division assaulted the beaches. The remainder of the battalion departed Nukufetau in March 1944 after being relieved by elements of the 51st Defense Battalion. The 2d Airdrome Battalion sailed for Hawaii, landing at Nawiliwili Harbor on March 21, 1944.

=== Reorganization and Tinian ===
The 2d Airdrome Battalion was redesignated as the 17th Defense Battalion on March 22, 1944, and assigned to the V Amphibious Corps. On April 19, 1944, it was again re-designated as the 17th Antiaircraft Battalion. In Hawaii, the battalion trained for the occupation and defense of small islands in the Pacific. Between June 10–18 the battalion departed Hawaii in three echelons. The unit spent the next 54 days at sea enroute to its final objective. While anchored in the harbor at Eniwetok on July 1, 1944 the battalion's moniker was changed for the final time, this time to the 17th Antiaircraft Artillery Battalion.

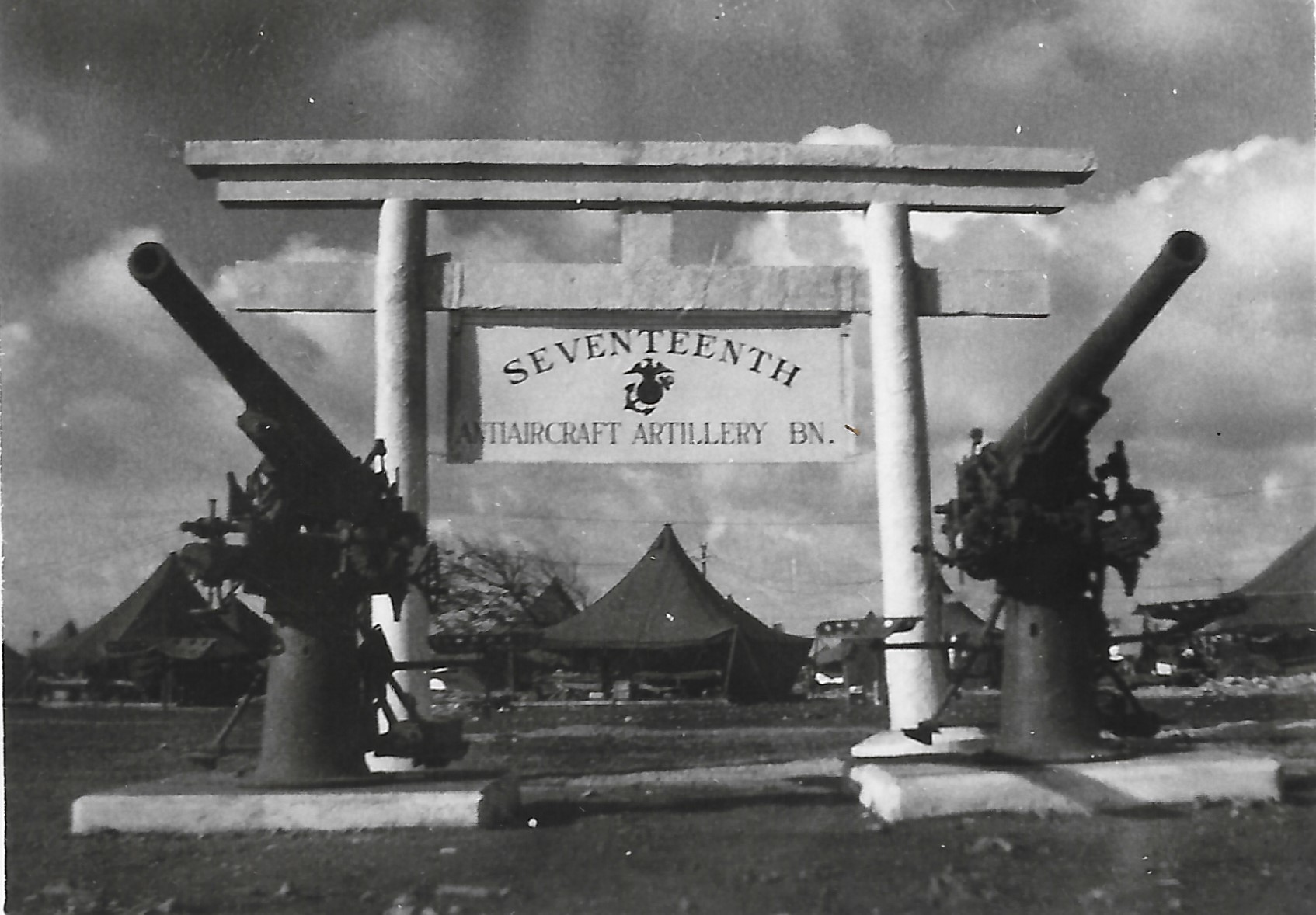
17th AAA Battalion sign on Tinian in 1945.

The 17th Defense Battalion landed on Tinian on August 2, 1944. The battalion immediately established anti-aircraft positions north of the airfield and in the harbor. The 17th remained on occupation duty on Tinian for the next year. During this time, it conducted routine patrols and took a number of Japanese prisoners of war remaining on the island after the battle. Three Japanese aircraft bombed and strafed the island on November 3, 1944; however, the battalion's batteries were unable to successfully engage any of the aircraft. When the USS Indianapolis arrived at Tinian on July 26, 1945, Marines from the battalion were tasked with unloading the atomic bombs from the ship. The battalion was guarding the airfield on August 6, 1945, when the Enola Gay launched to drop the first ever nuclear weapon against Hiroshima in mainland Japan. On August 15, 1945, the 17th Antiaircraft Artillery Battalion was relieved of its tactical duties on Tinian. It finally departed the island on November 1, 1945, on the USS Griggs (APA-110). The battalion sailed back to the United States and was officially decommissioned on December 6, 1945, at Marine Corps Base Camp Pendleton, California.

== Gallery ==
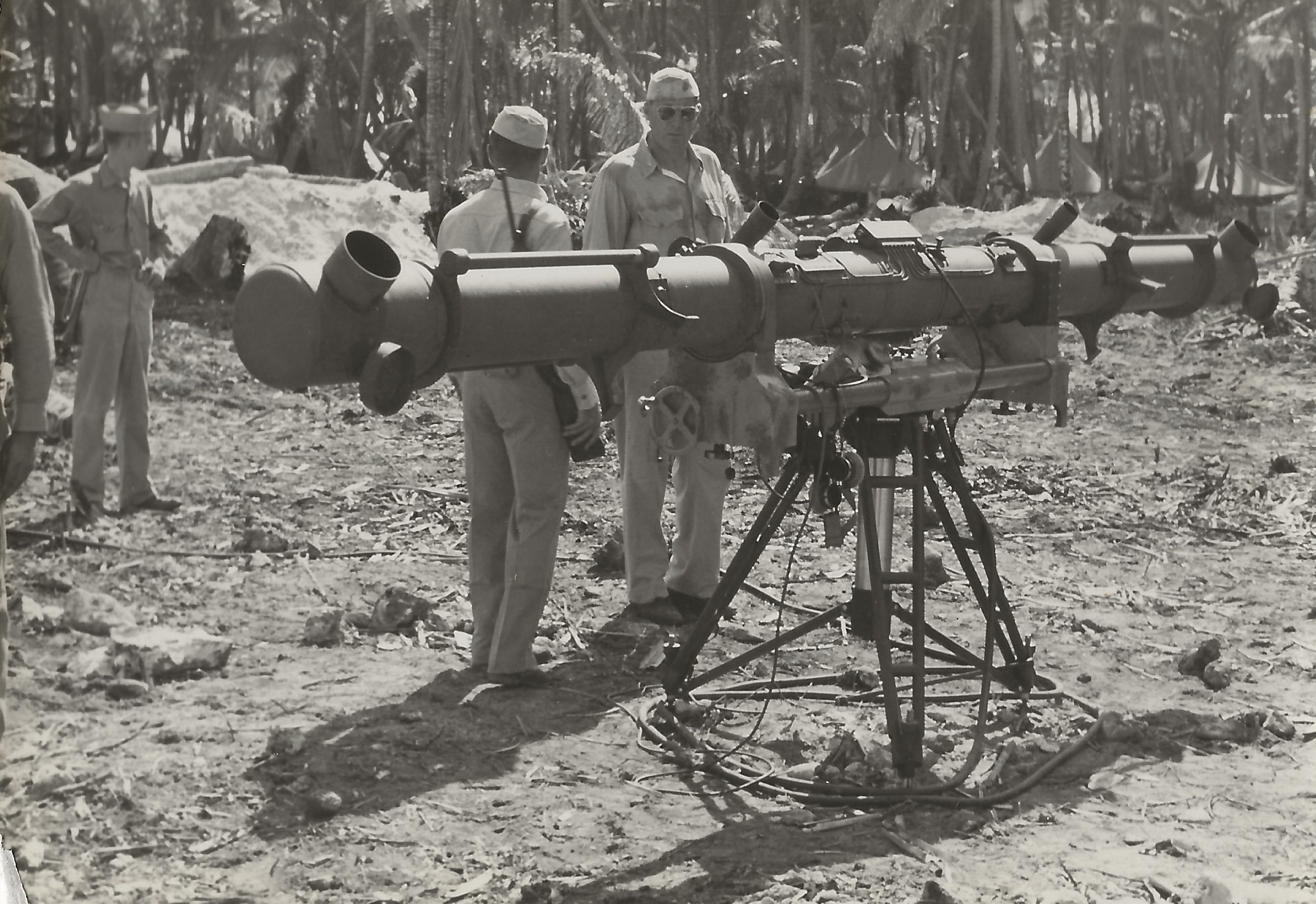
Coincidence rangefinder being utilized on Nukufetau on November 27, 1943.

== Unit awards ==
A unit citation or commendation is an award bestowed upon an organization for the action cited. Members of the unit who participated in said actions are allowed to wear on their uniforms the awarded unit citation. The 17th Antiaircraft Artillery Battalion has been presented with the following awards:

Streamer	Award	Year(s)	Additional Info
	Asiatic-Pacific Campaign Streamer		Tinian
	World War II Victory Streamer	1941–1945	Pacific War

== See also ==
- Marine Defense Battalions
- List of United States Marine Corps aviation support units
