= Temotuloto =

Islet of Nukufetau, Tuvalu

Coordinates: 8.0353°S 178.3199°E

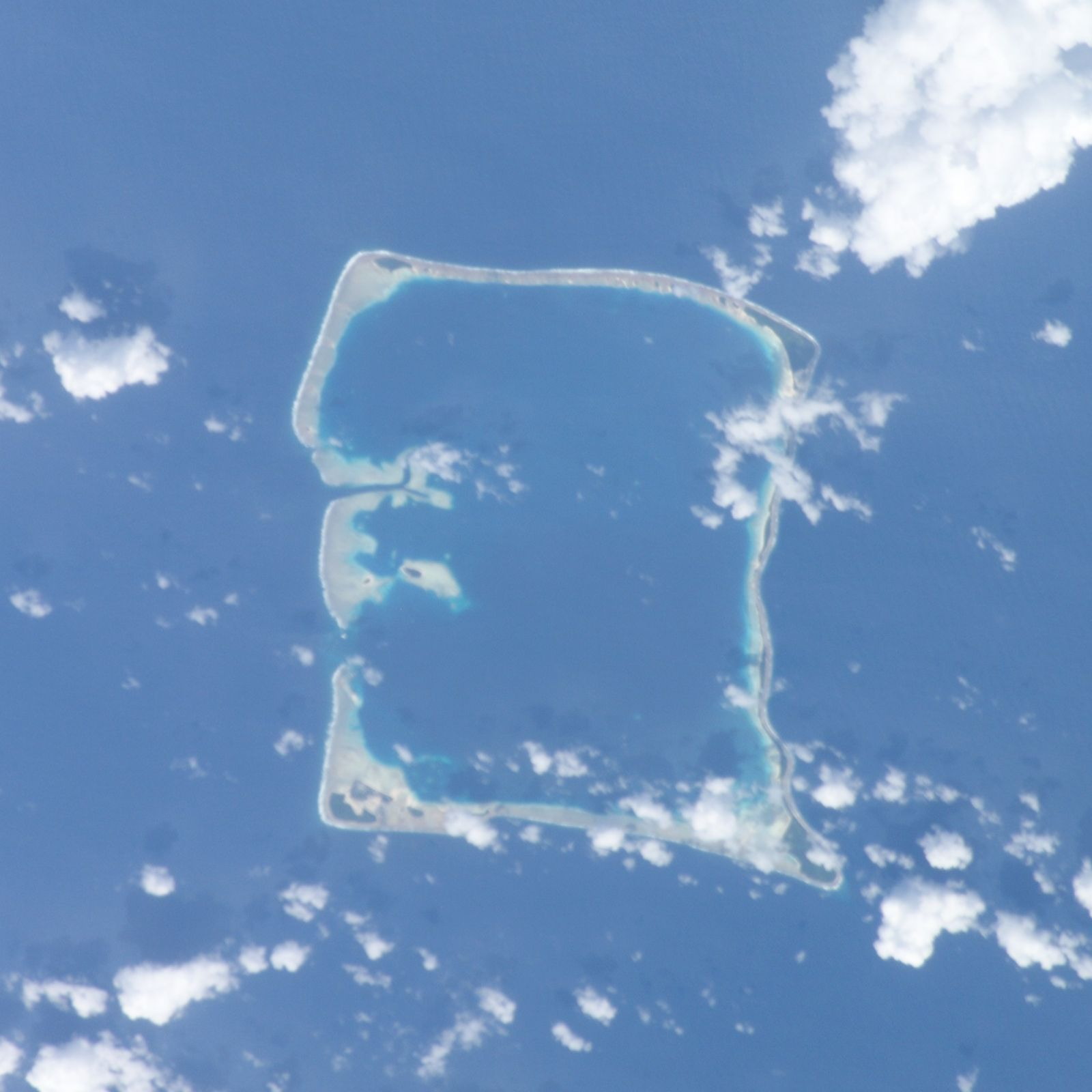
Nukufetau atoll, Tuvalu

Temotuloto is an islet of Nukufetau, Tuvalu to the east of Fale islet.
