= Motuloa =

Motuloa may refer to:

- Motuloa (Funafuti), an island in Funafuti, Tuvalu
- Motuloa (north of Nukufetau), an island in Nukufetau, Tuvalu
- Motuloa (south of Nukufetau), an island in Nukufetau, Tuvalu
