= Faiava Lasi =

Island in Nukufetau atoll, Tuvalu

Coordinates: 7.9855°S 178.4244°E

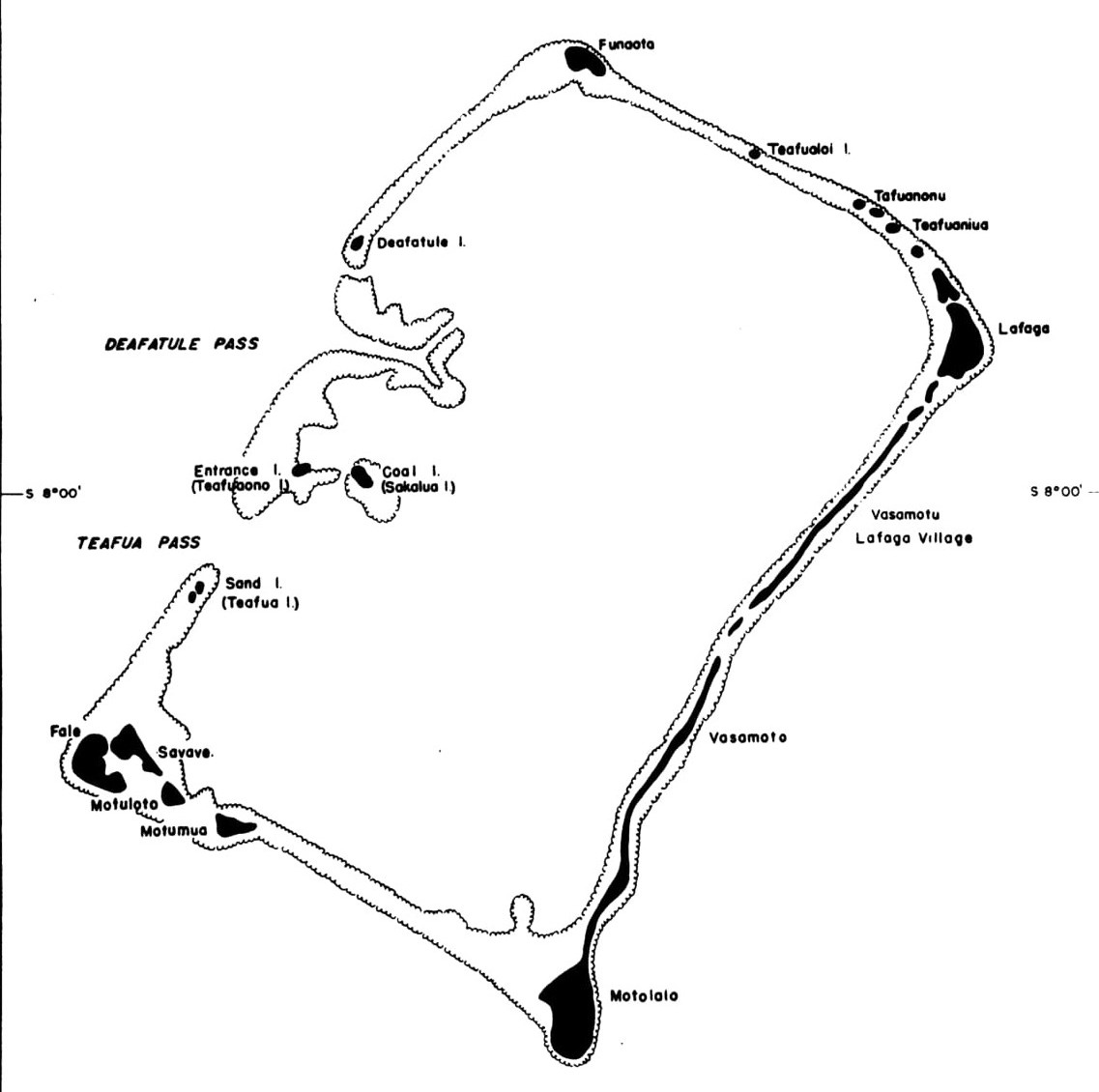
Map of Nukufetau atoll with Lafaga islet on the top right

Faiava Lasi is an islet of Nukufetau, Tuvalu, which is immediately to the south of Lafaga islet at the North East of Nukufetau atoll.
