= Nanumea Airfield =

World War II airfield in Tuvalu

Nanumea Airfield
- Part of Seventh Air Force
- Nanumea, Tuvalu
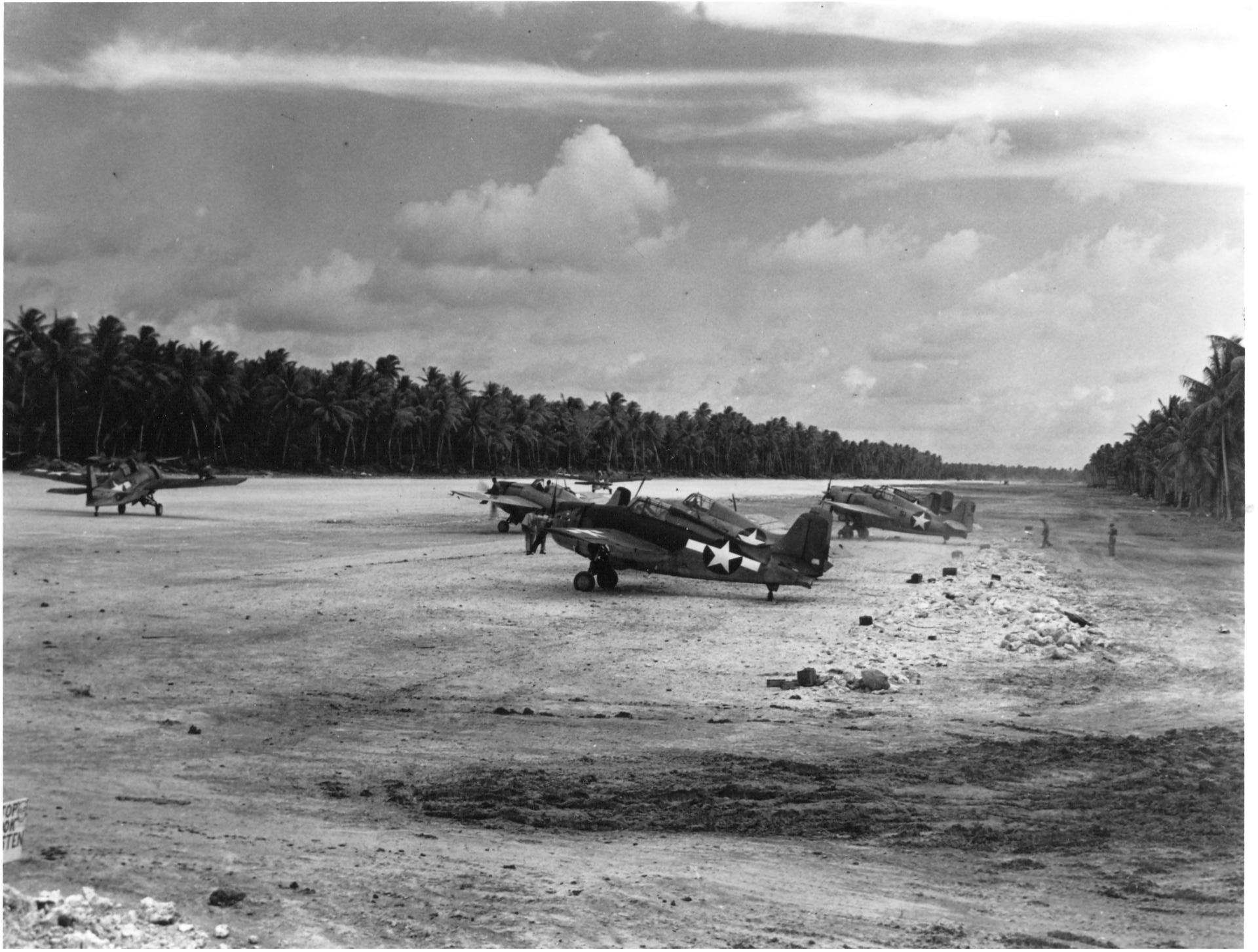
- F4F-4s of VMF-441 on alert at Nanumea 23 October 1943

Site information
- Type: Military Airfield
- Controlled by: United States Army Air Forces; United States Marine Corps
- Condition: abandoned

Location
- Coordinates: 05°41′00″S 176°07′44.4″E

Site history
- Built: 1943
- Built by: Seebees
- In use: 1943-5
- Materials: Coral

Nanumea Airfield was a World War II airfield on the island of Nanumea in the Ellice Islands (now known as Tuvalu).

== History ==
=== World War II ===
Nanumea Airfield was built by United States Navy Seabees during the Pacific War as an alternative strip to Nukufetau and Funafuti airfields, in order to allow for further dispersal of aircraft in the Ellice Islands (now Tuvalu).

On 5 September 1943, elements of the 16th Naval Construction Battalion arrived on Nanumea and on 11 September, they started work on a 7,000 feet (2,100 m) by 200 feet (61 m) bomber landing strip. On 7 September 1943, ten Betty bombers of the 755th Kōkūtai from Tarawa Atoll dropped 20 bombs on Nanumea.

On September 19, F4F-4s of VMF-441 landed on the strip and continued to use the runway for the remainder of the construction period. The first bombers landed on November 12. The Seabees also built a camp and operation facilities for the airfield, including an 8,000-barrel tank farm for aviation gasoline.

United States Army Air Forces (USAAF) units based at Nanumea included:

- 30th Bombardment Group headquarters from 11 November 1943 – 4 January 1944;
- 27th Bombardment Squadron operating B-24s from 10 November 1943 – 26 February 1944;
- 28th Bombardment Squadron operating B-24s from 12 November 1943 – 13 March 1944;
- 45th Fighter Squadron operating P-40Ns from 28 November 1943 – 4 January 1944.

United States Marine Corps (USMC) units based at Nanumea included:

- Marine Fighting Squadron 441 (VMF-441), flying the F4F Wildcat, operated from Nanumea from September to December 1943.
- Marine Attack Squadron 331 (VMA-331) flew Douglas SBD Dauntless dive bombers from Nanumea, starting on 15 November 1943.
- 7th Defense Battalion - Battalion arrived on September 4, 1943.

By September 1944, base roll-up and salvage operations had commenced and were completed by the end of March 1945. Wreckage of the aircraft remained on the island.

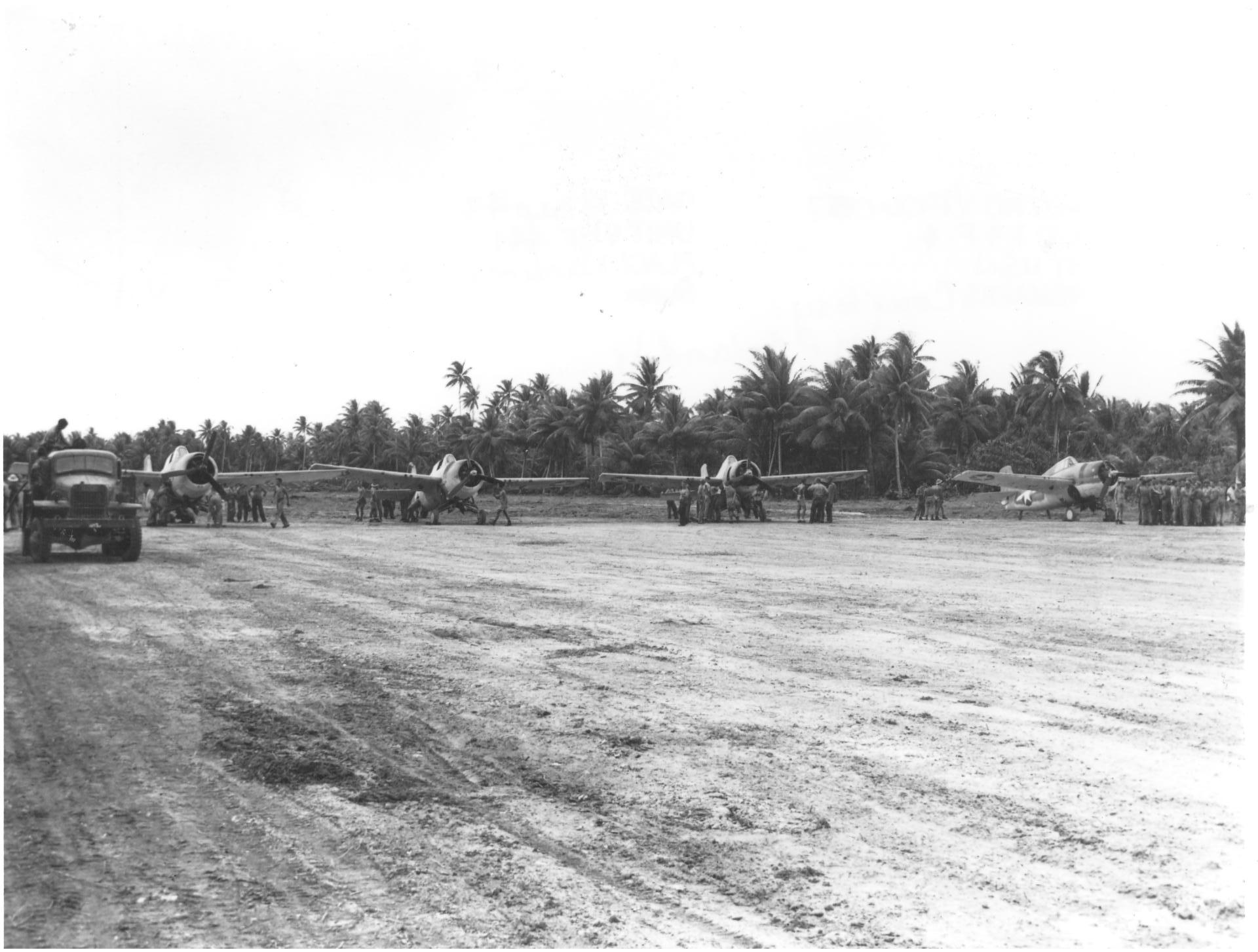
F4Fs of VMF-441 at Nanumea, 19 September 1943

=== Postwar ===
After the Pacific War, the airfield was dismantled and the land returned to its owners, however as the coral base was compacted to make the runway, the land now provides poor ground for growing coconuts.

== See also ==
- USAAF in the Central Pacific
- Funafuti Airfield
- Nukufetau Airfield
