= VMF-441 =

Marine Fighting Squadron 441
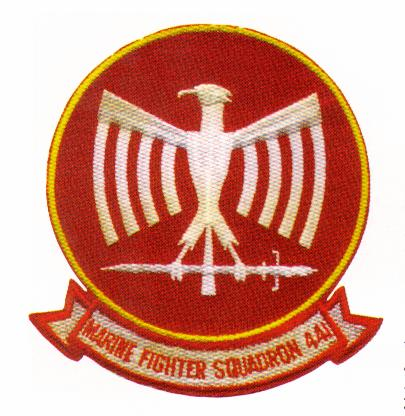
- VMF-441's insignia
- Active: 1 October 1942 – 11 Jul 1946; 1 Jul 1949 - Jun 1959
- Country: United States
- Allegiance: United States of America
- Branch: United States Marine Corps
- Type: Fighter squadron
- Role: Air interdiction Close air support
- Part of: Inactive
- Nickname: "Blackjacks"
- Engagements: World War II * Gilbert and Marshall Islands campaign * Battle of Okinawa

Aircraft flown
- Fighter: SNJ Texan; F4F-4 Wildcat; F4U-1/FG-1 Corsairs

Marine Fighting Squadron 441 (VMF-441) was a fighter squadron of the Marine Forces Reserve during the Cold War. Originally commissioned during World War II, the squadron fought during the Battle of Okinawa. Nicknamed "The Blackjacks", VMF-441 was credited with 49 planes shot during the course of the war. Following the surrender of Japan, the squadron was decommissioned on 11 July 1946. They were reactivated in the Marine Air Reserve and were based out of Naval Air Station Niagara Falls, New York.

== History ==
=== World War II ===
Marine Fighting Squadron 441 (VMF-441) was activated on 1 October 1942, at Tutuila on American Samoa from elements of VMF-111 and flew the F4F Wildcat. By the end of May 1943 the entire squadron had moved to Funafuti in the Ellice Islands and this was followed on 28 September 1943, by another move to Nanumea. The squadron moved back to Tutuila in December 1943 where they transitioned to the F4U-1 Corsair.

On 1 January 1944, VMF-441 joined Marine Aircraft Group 31 (MAG-31) on Roi-Namur. By March 1944 the squadron was again on the offensive conducting raids against Mili and Jaluit.

During the Battle of Okinawa, VMF-441 landed at Yontan Airfield on 7 April 1945. On 16 April 1945, four divisions of VMF-441 planes came to the rescue of the destroyer USS Laffey (DD-724) which had already been hit by five kamikazes. Their Corsairs attacked a flight of 25 Japanese planes and were credited with shooting down 15½ enemy planes, losing one of their own because he was flying so low that both he and the Japanese plane he was chasing clipped Laffey's superstructure. The squadron was still on Okinawa when the Japanese surrendered in August 1945. Shortly thereafter, the squadron was alerted for occupation duty in mainland Japan as part of Marine Aircraft Group 31 (MAG-31). Maj Paul T. Johnston, then commanding officer of the squadron, piloted the first Marine plane to land in mainland Japan when his F4U Corsair touched down at Yokosuka. He was quickly followed by the other 21 planes in his squadron. The squadron remained in Japan until March 1946. During their time on Occupation Duty the squadron logged over 3000 flight hours. They returned to the United States in April 1946 and were deactivated at Marine Corps Air Station Miramar, California on 11 July 1946.

=== Reserve years ===
VMF-441 was reactivated on 1 July 1949 at Naval Air Station Niagara Falls, New York. During the Korean War VMF-441 was mobilized for active duty beginning on 22 October 1951. The squadron remained at NAS Niagara Falls and continued to train until it was decommissioned in June 1959.

== Unit awards ==
A unit citation or commendation is an award bestowed upon an organization for the action cited. Members of the unit who participated in said actions are allowed to wear on their uniforms the awarded unit citation. VMF-441 was presented with the following awards:

Ribbon	Unit Award
	Presidential Unit Citation
	Asiatic-Pacific Campaign Medal
	World War II Victory Medal
	National Defense Service Medal with one Bronze Star

== See also ==
- United States Marine Corps Aviation
- Organization of the United States Marine Corps
- List of active United States Marine Corps aircraft squadrons
- List of decommissioned United States Marine Corps aircraft squadrons
