= Niuatui =

Island in Nukufetau atoll, Tuvalu

Coordinates: 7.9583°S 178.4282°E

Niuatui is an islet on the north-east of Nukufetau atoll, Tuvalu.
