= Matanukulaelae =

Islet in Nukufetau atoll, Tuvalu

Coordinates: 7°56′04″S 178°23′07″E

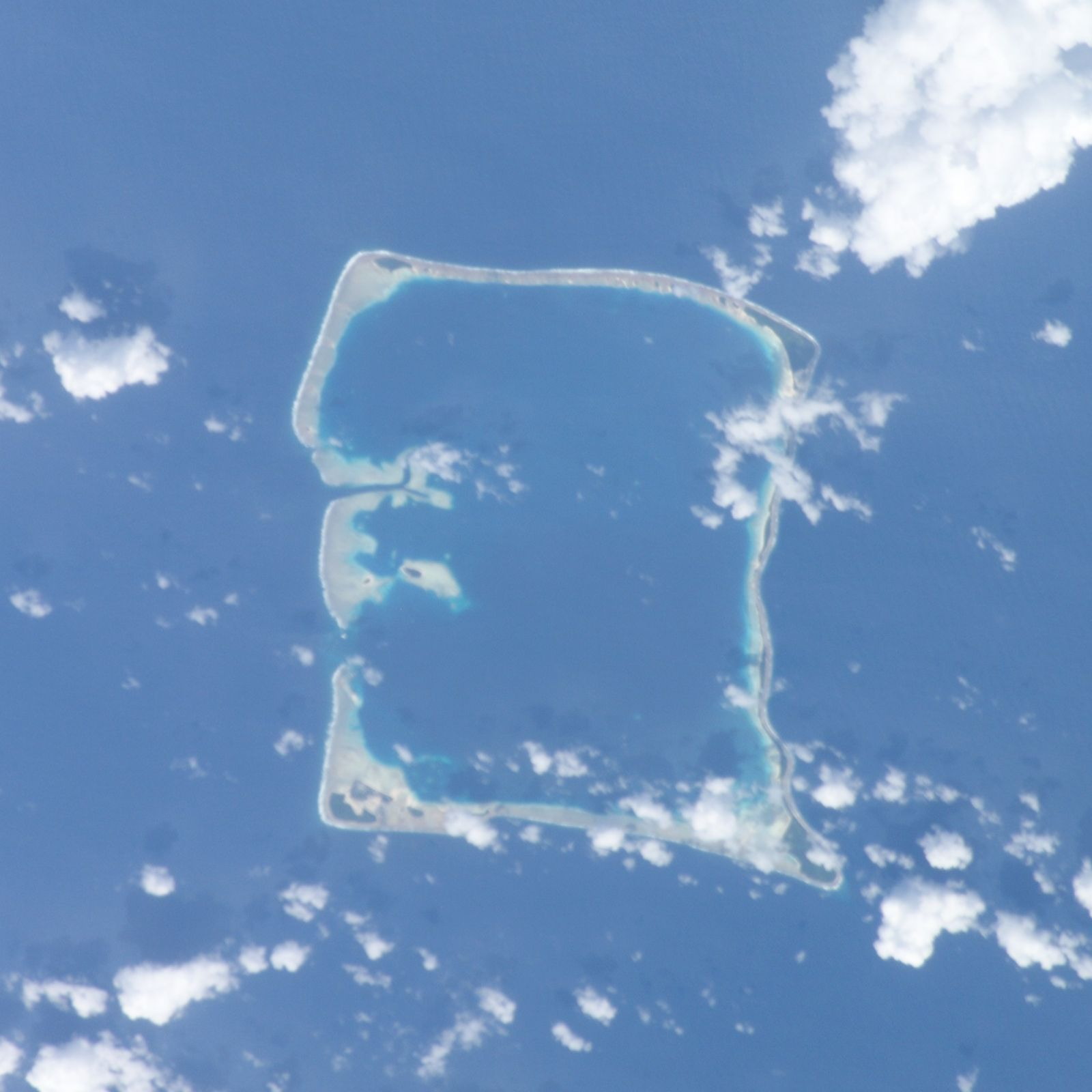
Nukufetau atoll, Tuvalu, from space

Matanukulaelae is an uninhabited islet of Nukufetau, Tuvalu. The estimate elevation above sea level is 5 meters.

== See also ==
- Desert island
- List of islands
