= Motufetau =

Islet of Nukufetau atoll, Tuvalu

Coordinates: 8.005°S 178.4083°E

Motufetau is a small uninhabited islet of Nukufetau, Tuvalu, which is on the east side of Nukufetau atoll.

== See also ==
- Desert island
- List of islands
