= Sakalua =

Island in Nukufetau atoll, Tuvalu

Coordinates: 7.9902°S 178.3487°E

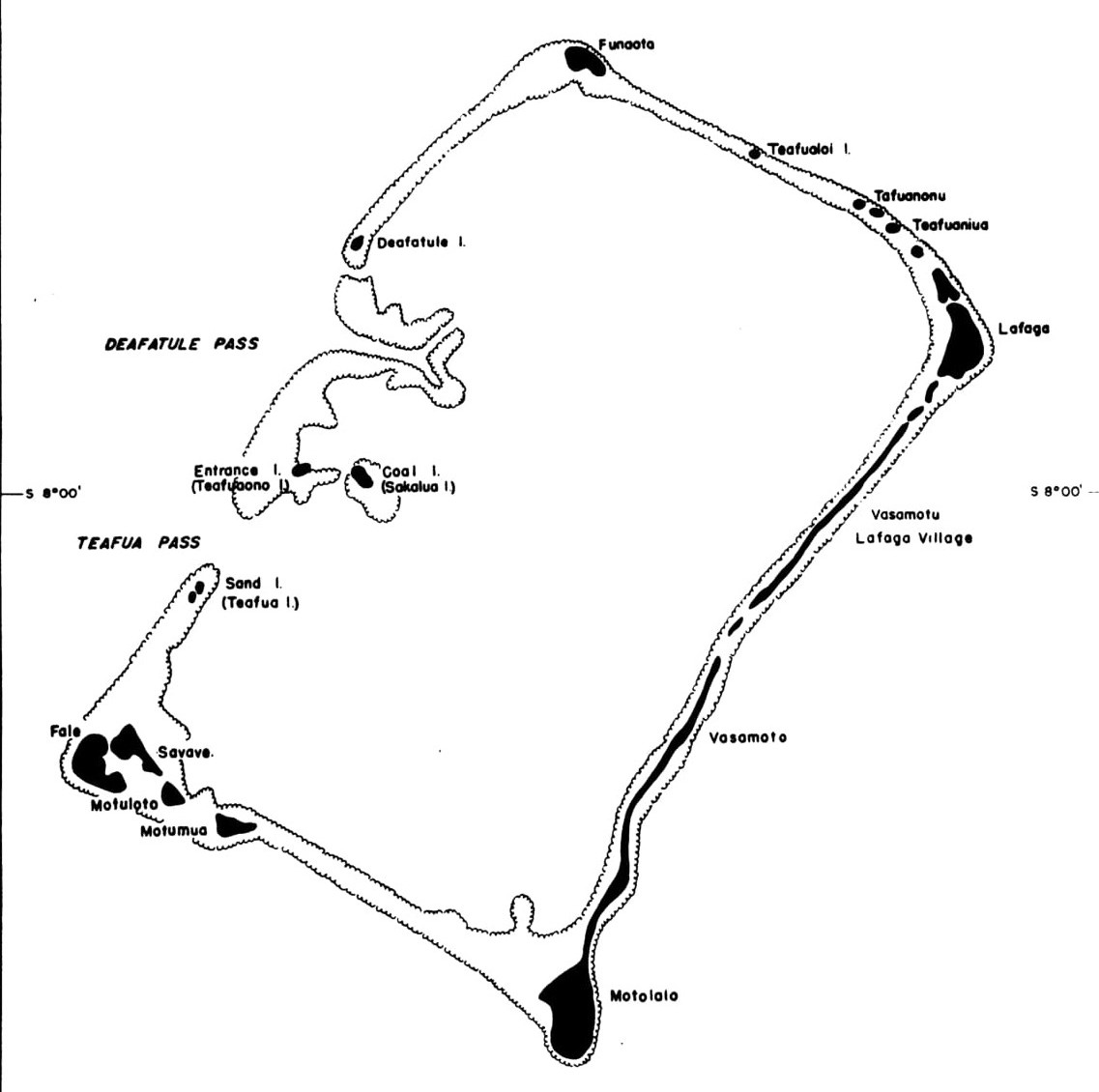
Map of Nukufetau with Sakalua islet on the left, labelled as Coal islet

Sakalua is an islet of Nukufetau, Tuvalu. In the 19th century whalers established a shore camp on Sakalua where coal was used to melt down the whale blubber. The islet has been known as 'Coal Island'.

The island has a large colony of terns.
