= Teafatule =

Islet in Nukufetau, Tuvalu

Coordinates: 7.9567°S 178.3483°E

Teafatule is an uninhabited islet of Nukufetau, Tuvalu.

== See also ==
- Desert island
- List of islands
