= Niualuka =

Island in Nukufetau atoll, Tuvalu

Coordinates: 7.9792°S 178.4295°E

Niualuka is an islet of Nukufetau, Tuvalu.
