= Oua =

Island in Nukufetau atoll, Tuvalu

Coordinates: 7.9603°S 178.4294°E

Oua is an islet on the north-east of Nukufetau atoll, Tuvalu, next to Lafanga atoll.
