= Funaota =

Island in Nukufetau atoll, Tuvalu

Coordinates: 7°56′S 178°23′E

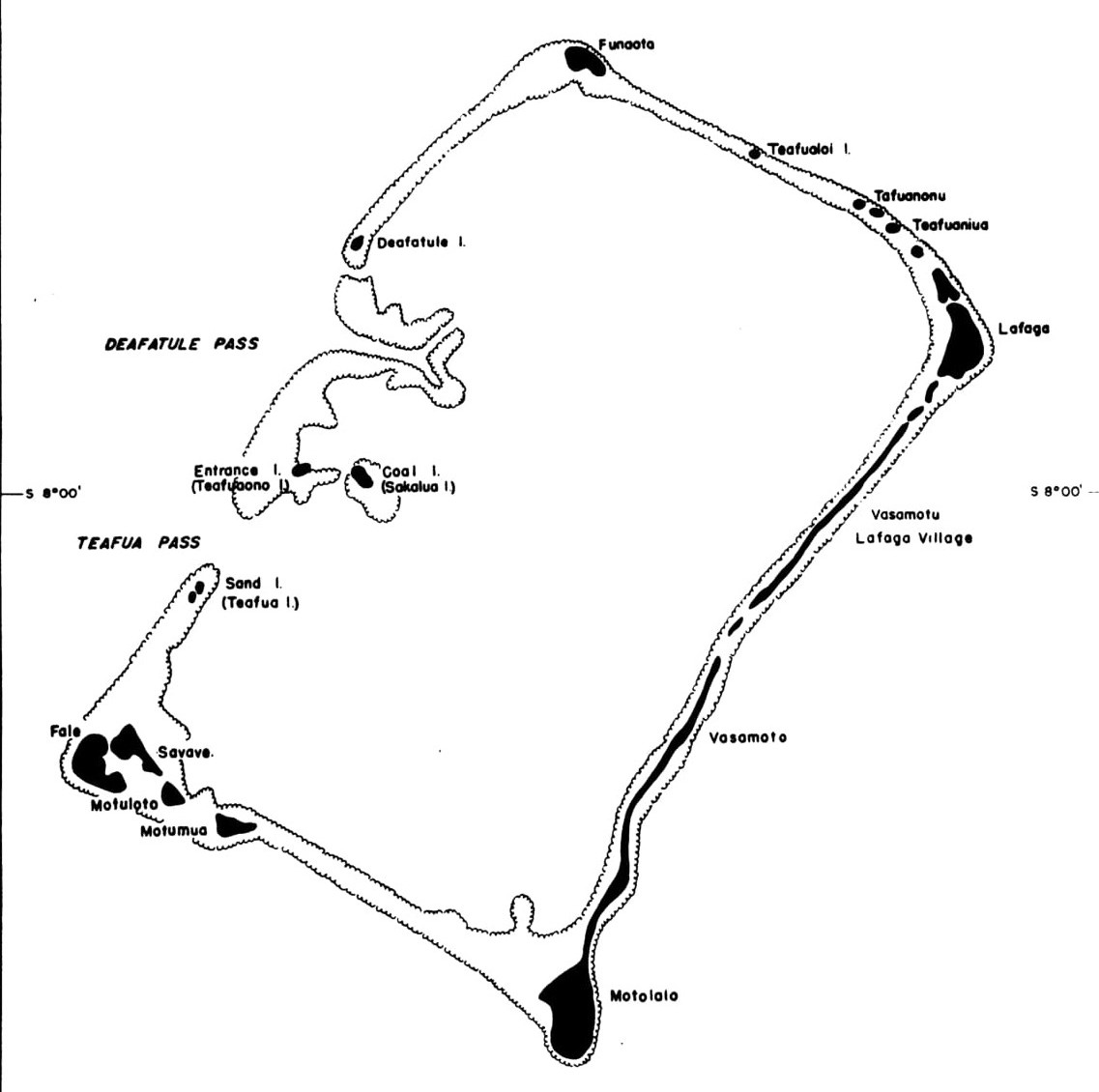
Map of Nukufetau with Funaota on the top

Funaota is an islet that is the northern point of Nukufetau atoll, Tuvalu.

Food is grown on Funaota and is sold to other islands in the atoll. In 2019 the produce included breadfruit, brown coconuts, germinating nuts and pigs.
