= Teafuone =

Island in Nukufetau atoll, Tuvalu

Coordinates: 7.9887°S 178.3397°E

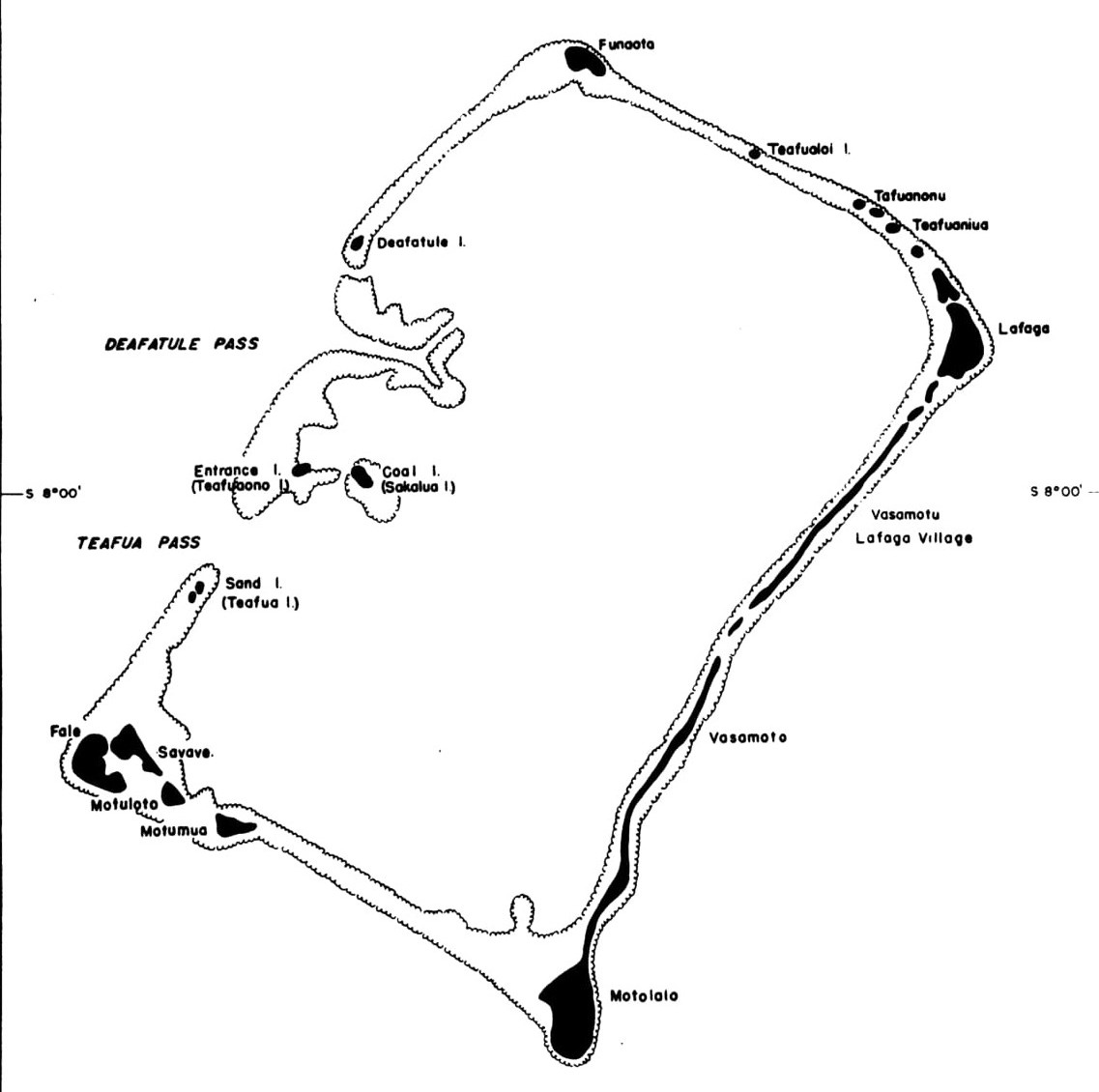
Map of Nukufetau with Teafuone on the left labelled as Entrance Island

Teafuone is an islet of Nukufetau, Tuvalu. Teafuone has also been known as Entrance Island as it is by the channel through the reef of Nukufetau.
