= Teafuanonu =

Islet in Nukufetau atoll, Tuvalu

Coordinates: 7.9516°S 178.4197°E

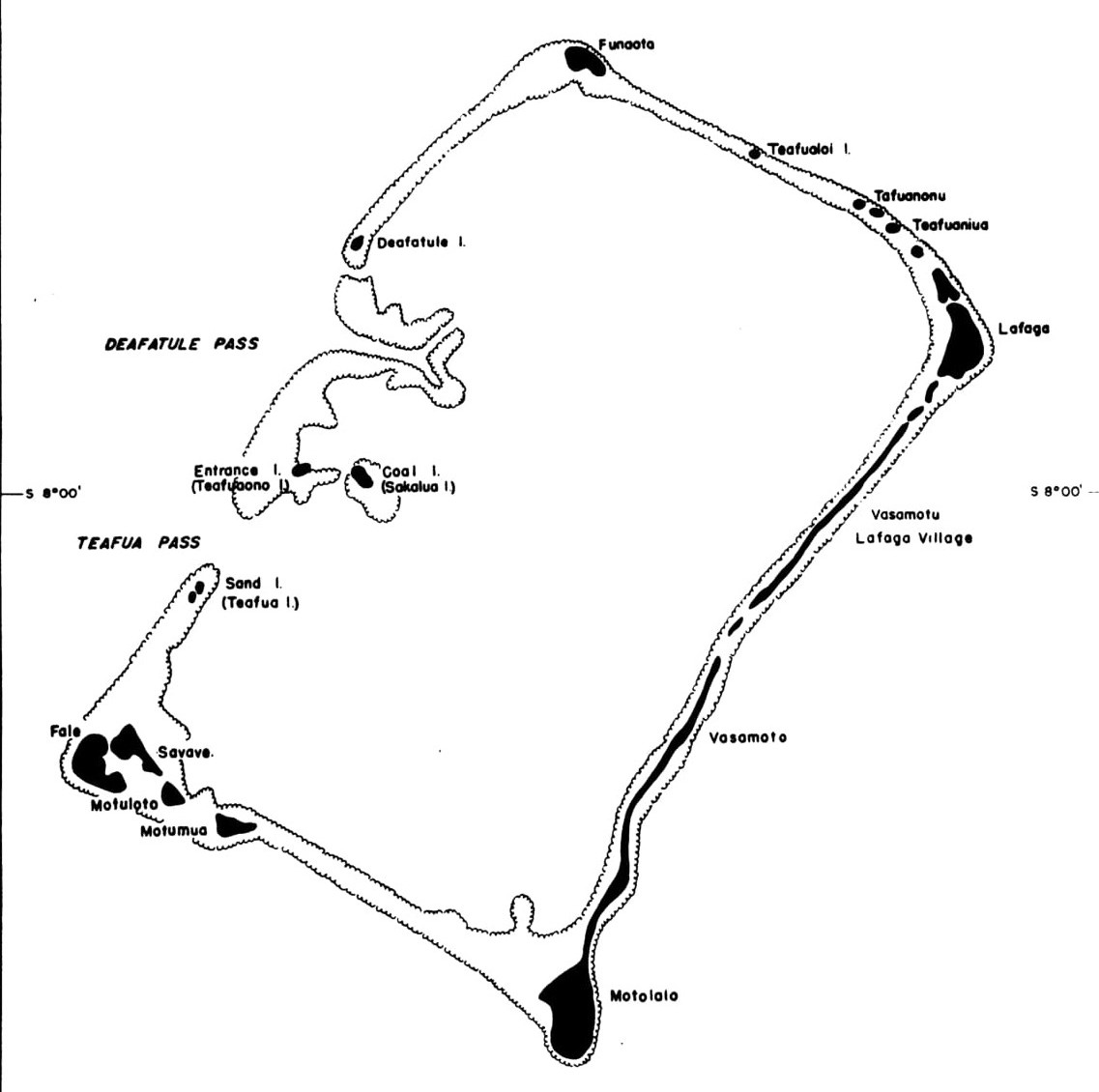
Map of Nukufetau with Teafuanonu on the north-east

Teafuanonu is an uninhabited islet on the north-east of Nukufetau atoll, Tuvalu.

== See also ==
- Desert island
- List of islands
