= Savave =

Island in Nukufetau atoll, Tuvalu

Coordinates: 8°01′41″S 178°18′52″E

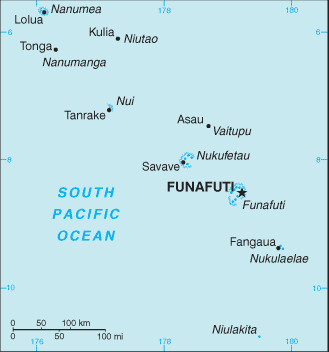
Map of Tuvalu, showing major towns and islands.

Savave is a village and islet of Nukufetau, Tuvalu, which is on the lagoon side of Fale islet. It is also the name of the small village on the island. In the late 19th century, after the coming of the missionaries, the people of Nukufetau lived on Fale islet before shifting to Savave which is on the lagoon side of the Fale settlement.

In 1951, the school that was located on Motumua islet was transferred to Savave and became the government primary school for Nukufetau. It was named the Tutasi Memorial School in honour of its predecessor. It has 586 inhabitants. The Monument to the Friendship between Nukufetau and Nanumea is located on the islet.
