= Nukufetau Airfield =

Nukufetau Airfield
- Part of Seventh Air Force
- Nukufetau, Gilbert and Ellice Islands

Site information
- Type: Military airfield
- Controlled by: United States Army Air Forces; United States Marine Corps

Location
- Coordinates: 08°03′54″S 178°22′38″E (Approximate)

Site history
- Built: 1943
- In use: 1943

Nukufetau Airfield is a former World War II airfield on the south-eastern side of Nukufetau on Motulalo Island in Tuvalu during the Pacific War.

== History ==
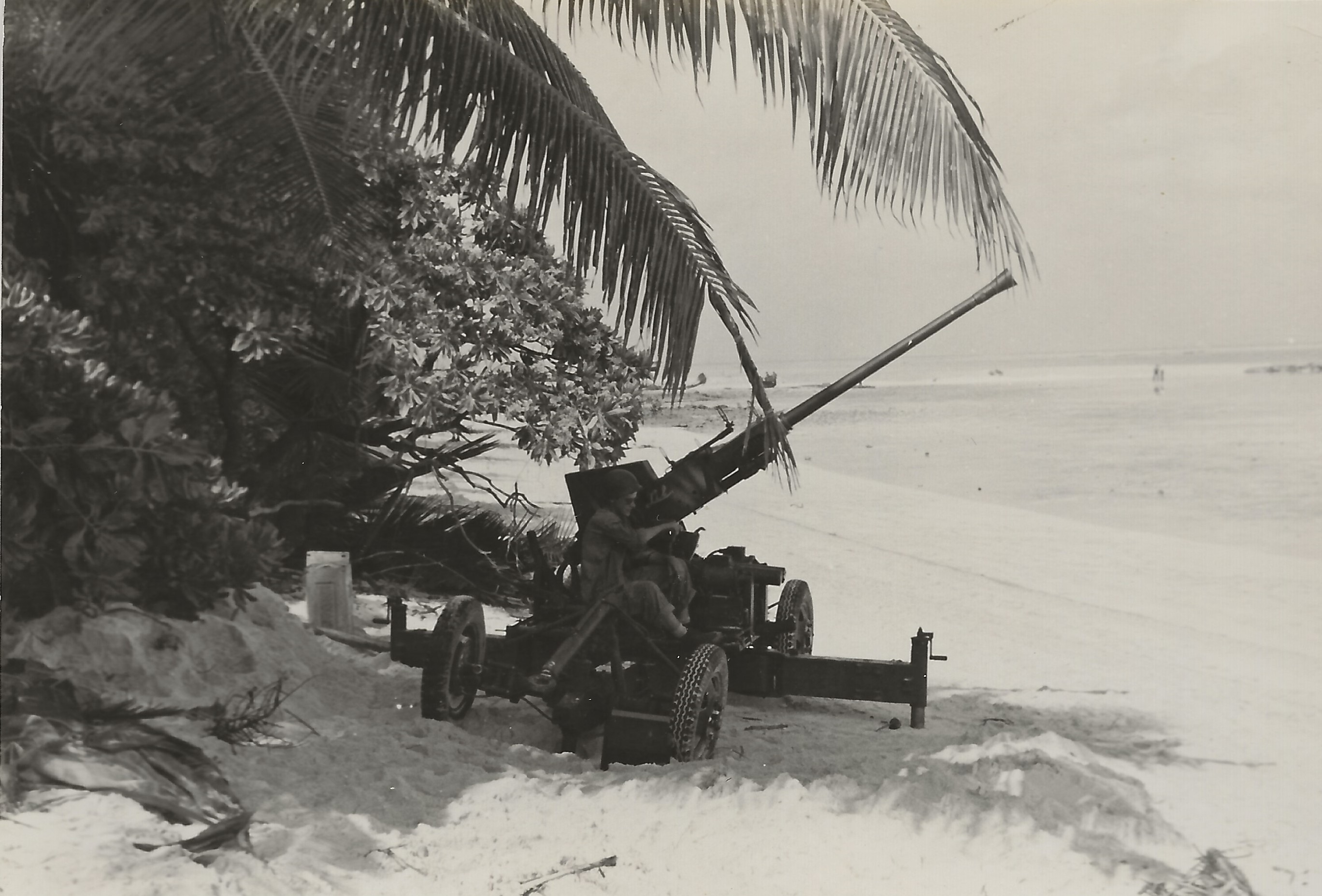
40mm antiaircraft gun from the United States Marine Corps' 2d Airdrome Battalion defending the LST offload at Nukufetau on August 28, 1943.

Nukufetau Airfield was built by United States Navy Seabees on Motulalo island as an alternative strip to Nanumea and Funafuti airfields to allow for further dispersal of aircraft in the Ellice Islands (now Tuvalu). Two intersecting runways formed an "X" shape. On 8 September 1943 the 16th Naval Construction Battalion commenced construction of a fighter strip (3500 feet by 200 feet) and a bomber strip (6100 feet by 220 feet). Nearly 50,000 coconut trees had to be cut down and about 2,000 feet of the runways were built on fill over swamp. The first plane to land on the airfield was a PB4Y Privateer piloted by Major General Charles F. B. Price on October 3, 1943. The general conducted a quick inspection of the new airfield and quickly took off again. The airfield was officially opened on October 6, 1943.

United States Marine Corps (USMC) units based at Nukufetau included:

- Navy Bombing Squadron 108 (VB-108), operating PB4Y-1 Liberators, landed on 7 November 1943
- Marine Scout Bomber Squadron 331 (VMSB-331), operating Douglas SBD Dauntless dive bombers, arrived on 15 November 1943
- 2d Airdrome Battalion - responsible for air defense of the base from August 1943 - March 1944.

United States Army Air Forces (USAAF) using the base included:

- 26th Bombardment Squadron operating B-24s from 11 November 1943 – 25 January 1944
- 98th Bombardment Squadron operating B-24s from 11 November 1943 – 20 January 1944

=== Postwar ===
The debris from a crashed B-24 Liberator remained on the island. After the Pacific War the airfield was dismantled and the land returned to its owners, however as the coral base was compacted to make the runways the land now provides poor ground for growing coconuts.

== See also ==
- USAAF in the Central Pacific
- Funafuti Airfield
- Nanumea Airfield
