= Entrance Island (Tasmania) =

Island in Tasmania, Australia

Coordinates: 42°12′S 145°12′E

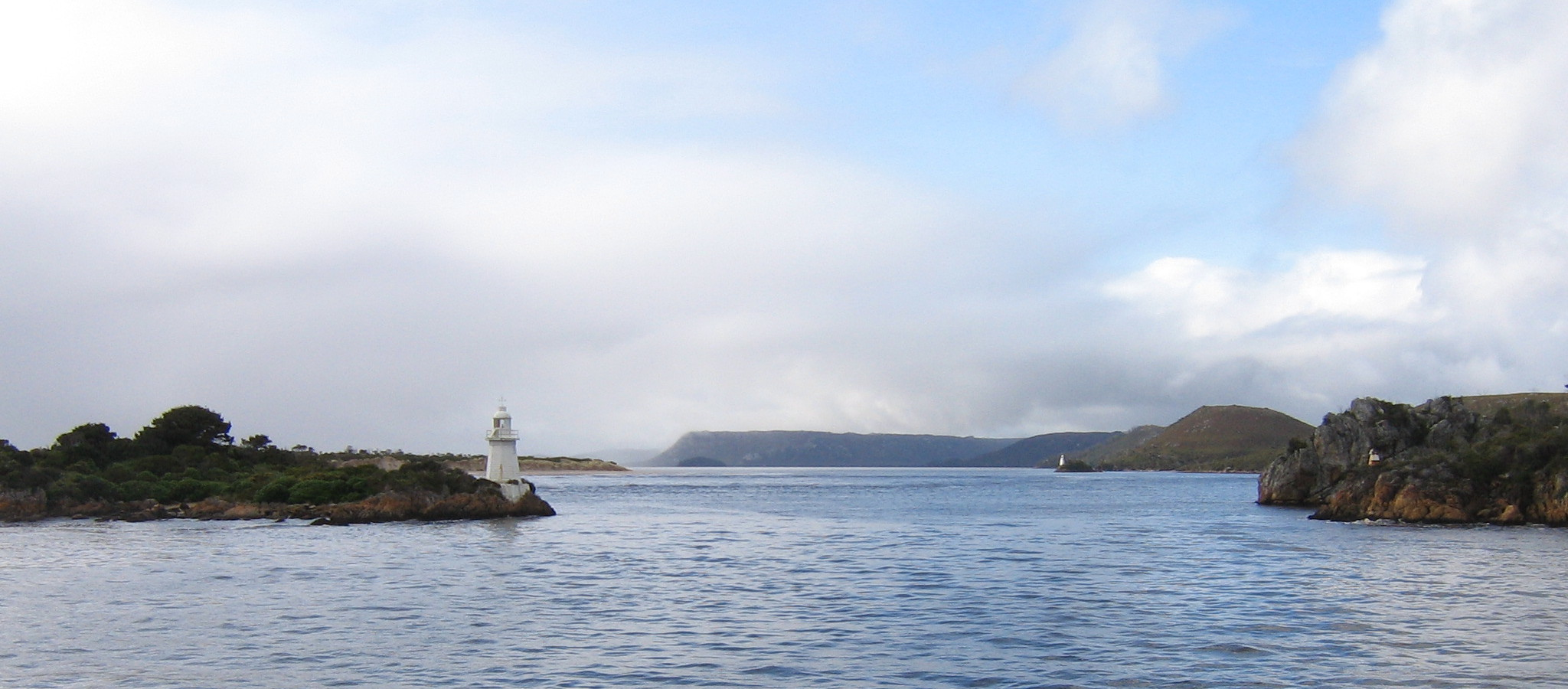
Entrance to left

Entrance Island is a low island with an area of 6.1 ha. It lies at the entrance to Macquarie Harbour in Western Tasmania at an area known as Hell's Gates. It contains a light beacon and jetty.

== Fauna ==
Recorded breeding seabird species are the little penguin (100 pairs) and short-tailed shearwater (1900 pairs). The metallic skink is present.
