= Nukufetau =

Atoll and one of nine districts of Tuvalu

- Atoll
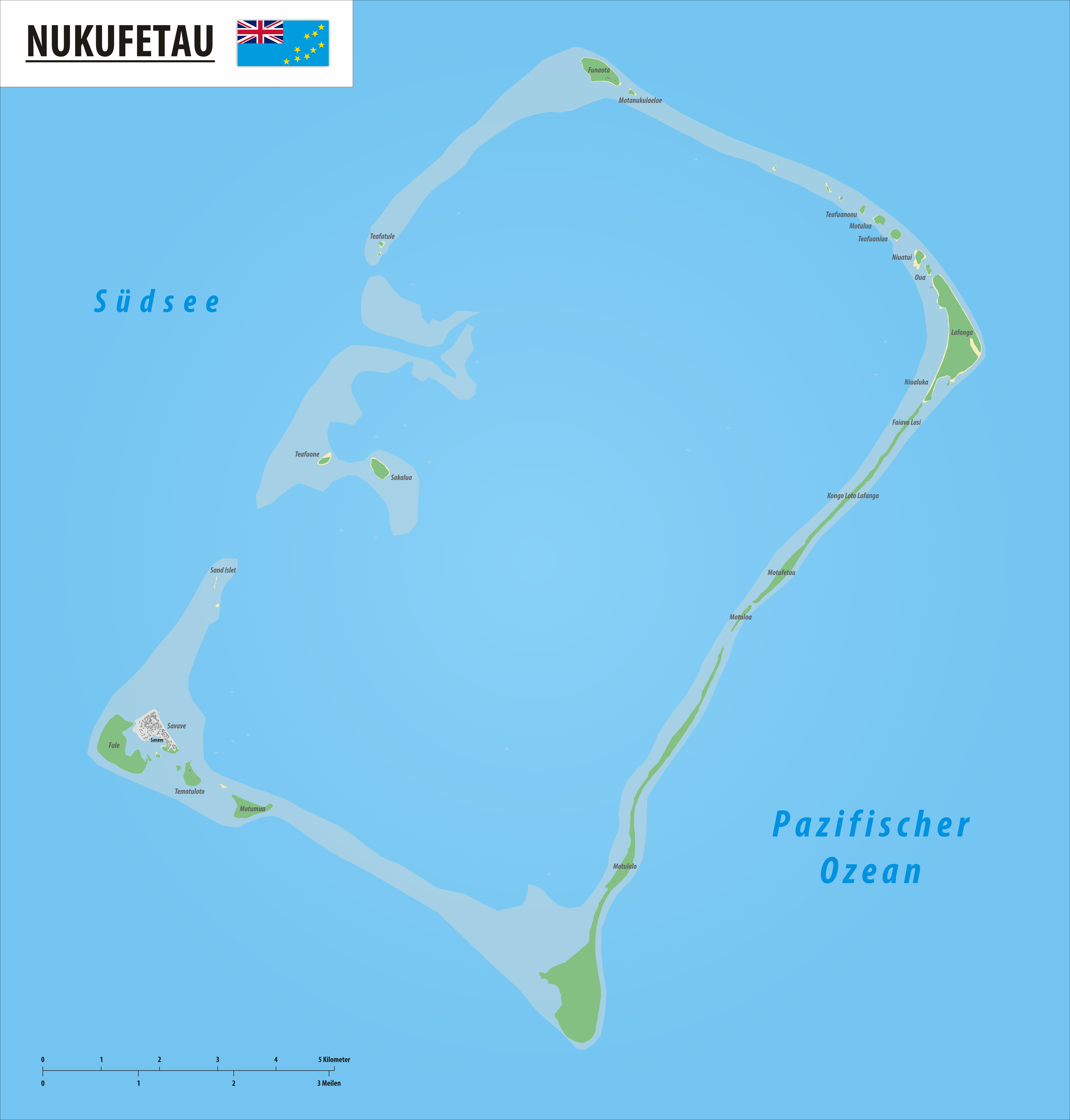

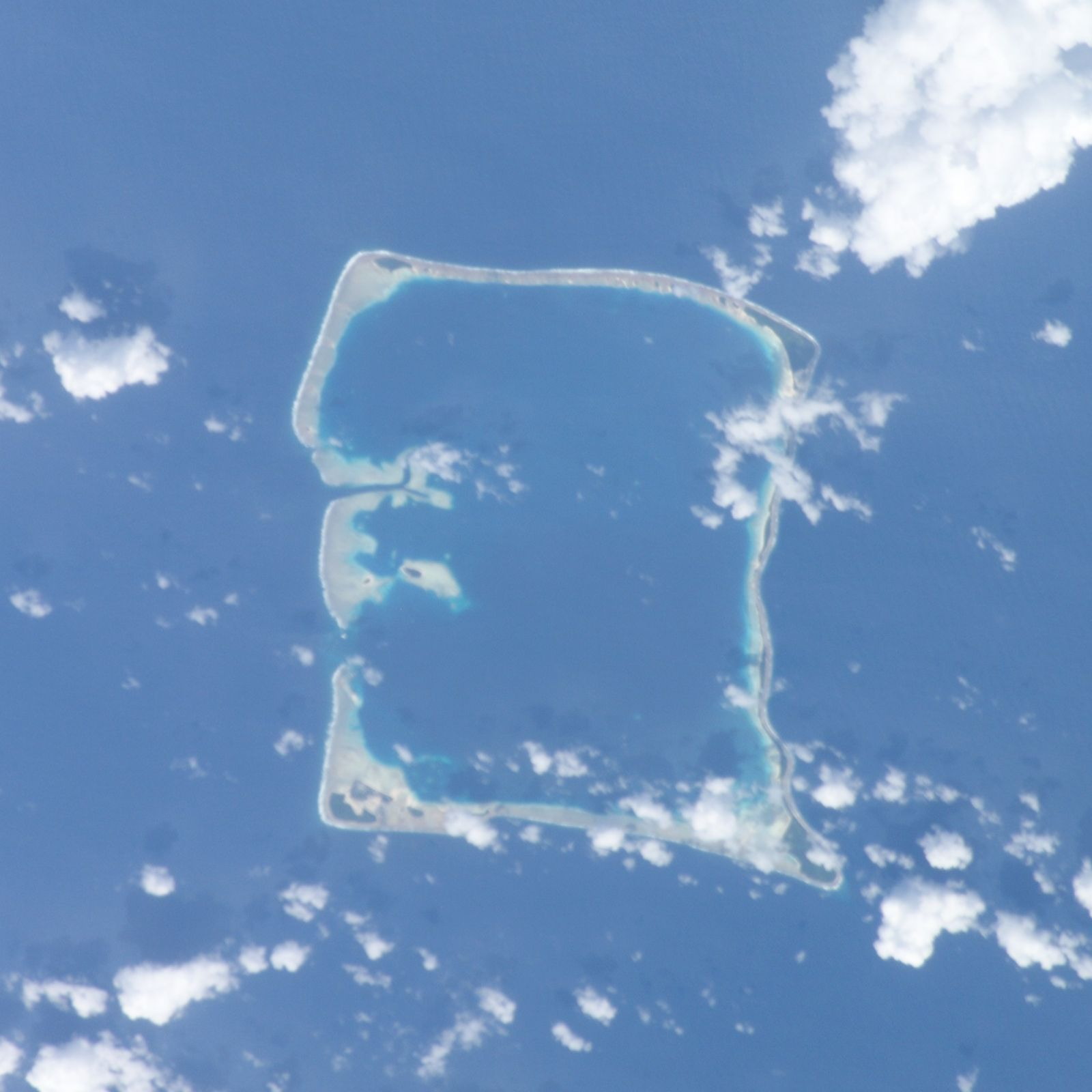
- Nukufetau atoll from space

- Map of the atoll

- Location in Tuvalu
- Coordinates: 08°00′S 178°22′E
- Country: Tuvalu

Area
  - Total: 2.99 km^{2} (1.15 sq mi)

Population (2022)
  - Total: 581
  - Density: 194/km^{2} (503/sq mi)
- ISO 3166 code: TV-NKF

Nukufetau is an atoll that is part of the nation of Tuvalu. The atoll was claimed by the US under the Guano Islands Act some time in the 19th century and was ceded in a treaty of friendship concluded in 1979 and coming into force in 1983. It has a population of 581 who live on Savave islet (2022 Census).

== Geography ==
Nukufetau is an atoll with passages through the reef that allow large ships to enter and anchor in the lagoon. Nukufetau consists of at least 33 islets:

- Faiava Lasi
- Fale
- Funaota
- Kongo Loto Lafanga
- Lafanga
- Matanukulaelae
- Motufetau
- Motulalo
- Motuloa (north of Nukufetau)
- Motuloa (south of Nukufetau)
- Motumua
- Niualuka
- Niuatui
- Oua
- Sakalua
- Savave
- Teafatule
- Teafuaniua
- Teafuanonu
- Teafuone
- Temotuloto
- and at least 12 other islands

The biggest island is Motulalo. In the late 19th century, after the coming of the missionaries, the people of Nukufetau lived on Fale islet before shifting to Savave which is on the lagoon side of the Fale settlement.

On Savave islet 331 people live in Aulotu and 191 live in Maneapa (2012 census).

== History ==
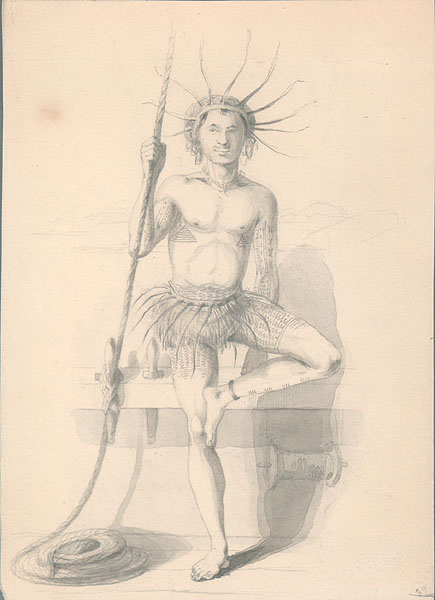
Nukufetau islander (1841).

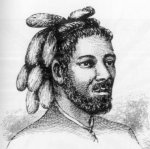
A man from the Nukufetau atoll, drawn by Alfred Agate in 1841.

The traditional history of Nukufetau is that a party of Tongans were the first people to settle. When they landed they found only one fetau (or fetaʻu in Tongan) tree growing on the atoll, so they called the place Nukufetau – the island of the fetau. They planted coconut trees and settled on Fale on the western side of the atoll.

Arent Schuyler de Peyster, of New York, captain of the armed brigantine or privateer Rebecca, sailing under British colours, passed through the southern Tuvalu waters in May 1819 sighting Nukufetau.

In 1820 the Russian explorer Mikhail Lazarev visited Nukufetau as commander of the Mirny.

The United States Exploring Expedition under Charles Wilkes visited Nukufetau in 1841.

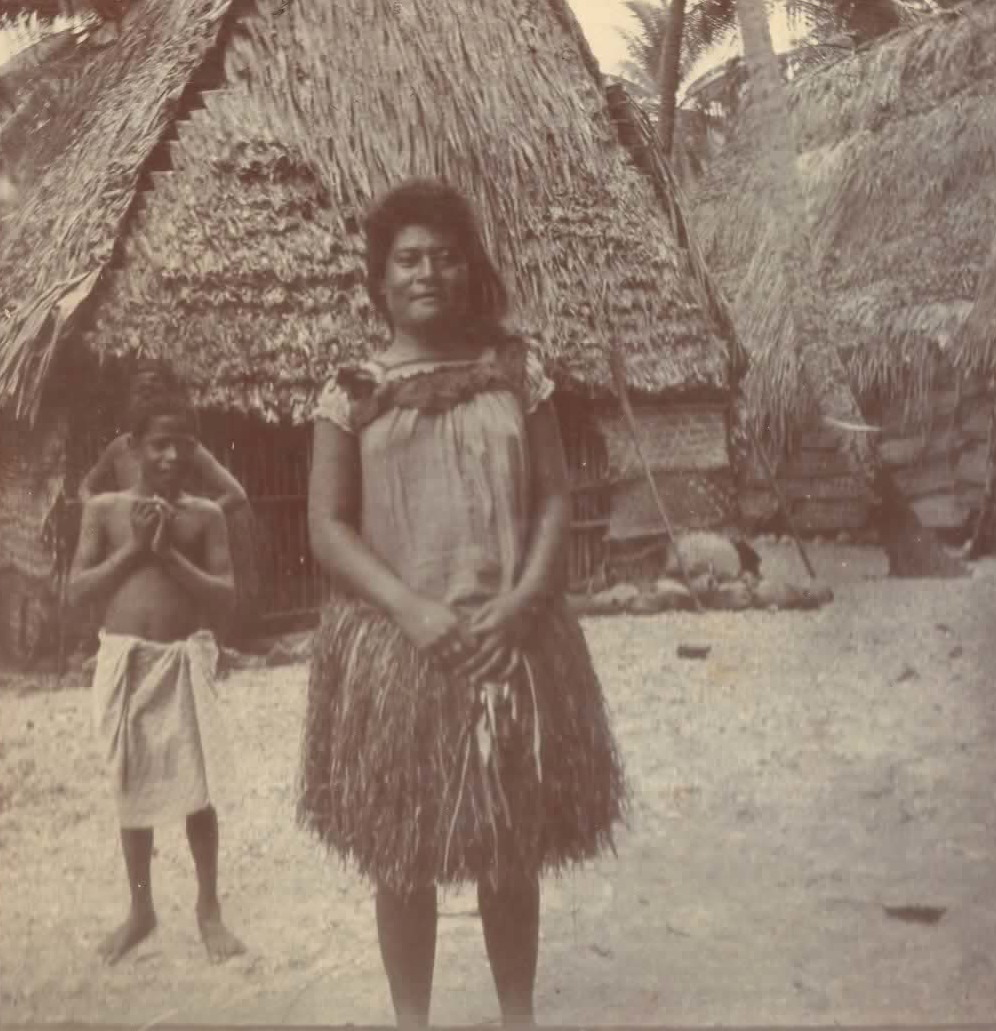
Tamala of Nukufetau atoll, Ellice Islands (circa 1900–1910)

Louis Becke, who later became a writer, operated a store on Nukufetau from February 1881 to August 1881. Becke later wrote a story about a fishing expedition: The Fisher Folk Of Nukufetau.

The population of Nukufetau from 1860 to 1900 is estimated to be 250 people.

Alfred Restieaux was a trader on Nukufetau in the late 19th century from 1873 to 1879 and met his wife Litia. He returned sometime in the 1880s; in 1892 Captain Edward Davis, of HMS Royalist, recorded Alfred Restieaux and Emile Fenisot as trading on Nukufetau. Restieaux died on Nukufetau in 1911.

Nukufetau Post Office opened around 1925.

During World War II Coastwatchers, who observed and reported on Japanese shipping, had a station on Nukufetau. In 1943 United States Navy Seabees build a deepwater wharf and an airfield on Motulalo, which is the largest islet of Nukufetau. Two intersecting runways of Nukufetau Airfield formed an "X" shape.

B-24s were based at the airfield. The Marine Attack Squadron 331 (VMA-331) also flew Douglas SBD Dauntless dive bombers from Nukufetau. After the war the airfield was dismantled and the land returned to its owners, however as the coral base was compacted to make the runway the land now provides poor ground for growing coconuts.

There is a shipwreck at the southeast corner of the atoll, but only the bow and parts of the stern remain.

=== Cyclone Pam ===
Nukufetau was affected by storm surges caused by Cyclone Pam in early March 2015, which damaged houses, crops and infrastructure. As of 22 March, 76 people (13 percent of the population) were displaced and were living in 2 evacuation centres. The Situation Report published on 30 March reported that on Nukufetau all the displaced people have returned to their homes. Nukufetau suffered the loss of 90% of crops.

In 2016 a 500-metre seawall was constructed to improve the defences against severe wet weather events. The $8 million cost of the project was paid by the United Nations Development Programme and was carried out by dredging and civil contracting company Hall Pacific.

== Food ==
In addition to imported food, food is produced on Fale and on Funaota. The products include pulaka (a root crop), pigs, breadfruit, brown coconuts and germinating nuts.

== Politics ==
Enele Sopoaga and Panapasi Nelesoni were re-elected in the 2024 Tuvaluan general election.

Nukufetau constituency results
Party	Candidate	Votes	%
Nonpartisan	Panapasi Nelesoni	408	27.05
Nonpartisan	Enele Sopoaga	402	26.65
Nonpartisan	Taimitasi Paelati	374	24.80
Nonpartisan	Nikolasi Apenelu	324	21.48

== Education ==
In 1951 the school that was located on Motumua islet was transferred to Savave and became the government primary school for Nukufetau. It was named the Tutasi Memorial School in honour of its predecessor.

== Notable people ==
- Faimalaga Luka (April 15, 1940 – August 19, 2005) represented Nukufetau in the Parliament of Tuvalu. He served as Prime Minister (2001) and as Governor-General (2003-2005).
- Saufatu Sopoanga, Prime Minister of Tuvalu (2002-2004), represented Nukufetau in the parliament for a number of years.
- Enele Sopoaga, the younger brother of Saufatu Sopoanga, was elected to represent Nukufetau in the parliament in 2010, and served as the Prime Minister of Tuvalu from August 2013 until September 2019.
