= Motulalo =

Island in Nukufetau atoll, Tuvalu

Coordinates: 8.0647°S 178.3771°E

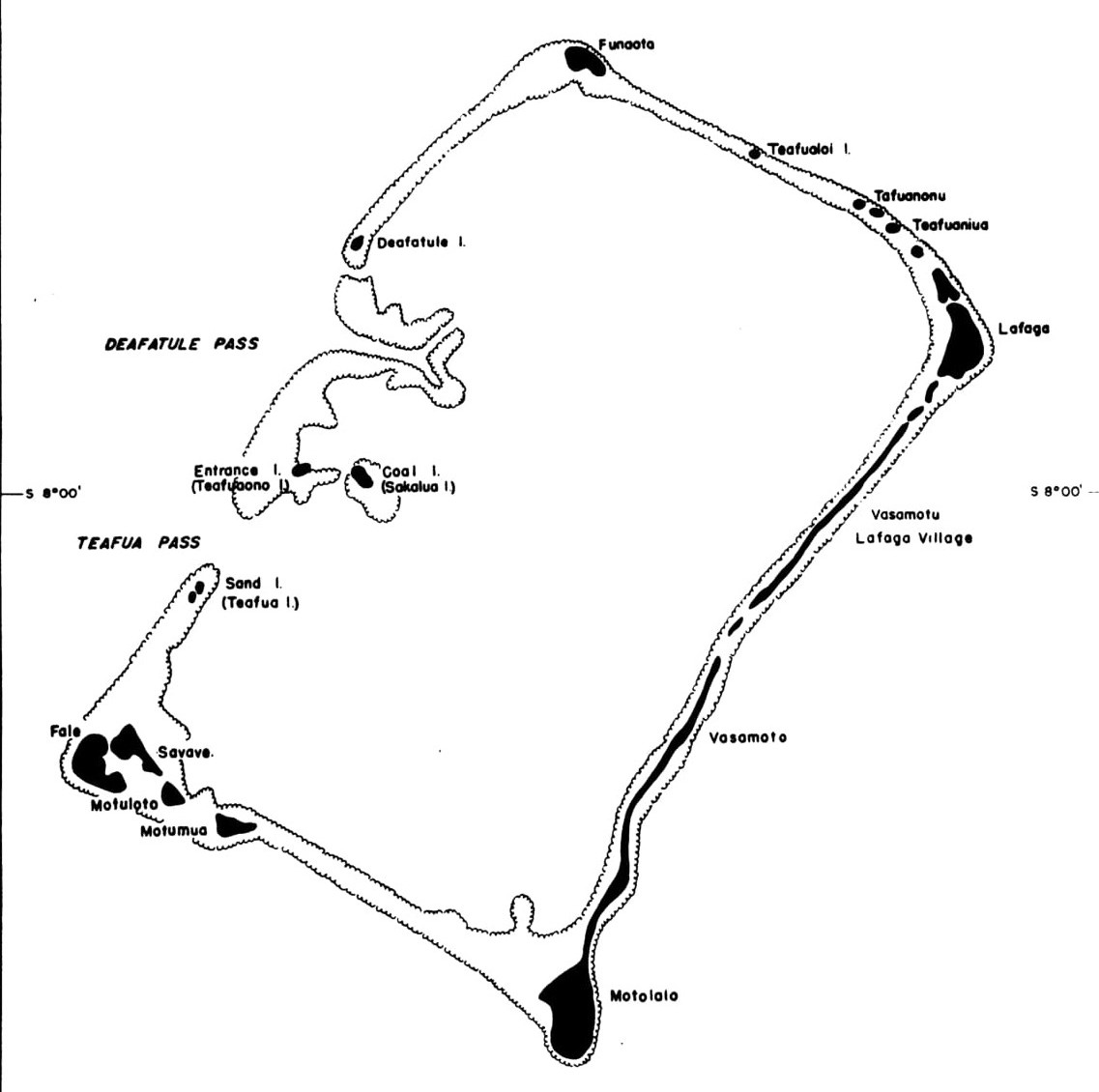
Map of Nukufetau with Motulalo on the bottom right

Motulalo is the largest islet of Nukufetau, Tuvalu. The traditional history of Nukufetau recalls that in order to protect the atoll from raiders from Tonga, Tauasa, an aliki (chief), was given Motulalo. Tauasa would pull up coconut trees and throw them at the raiders.

During World War II the American forces built an airfield and a deepwater wharf on Motulalo. After the war the airfield was dismantled and the land returned to its owners.
