= Motuloa (south of Nukufetau) =

Island in the south of Nukufetau atoll, Tuvalu

Coordinates: 8.0113°S 178.402°E

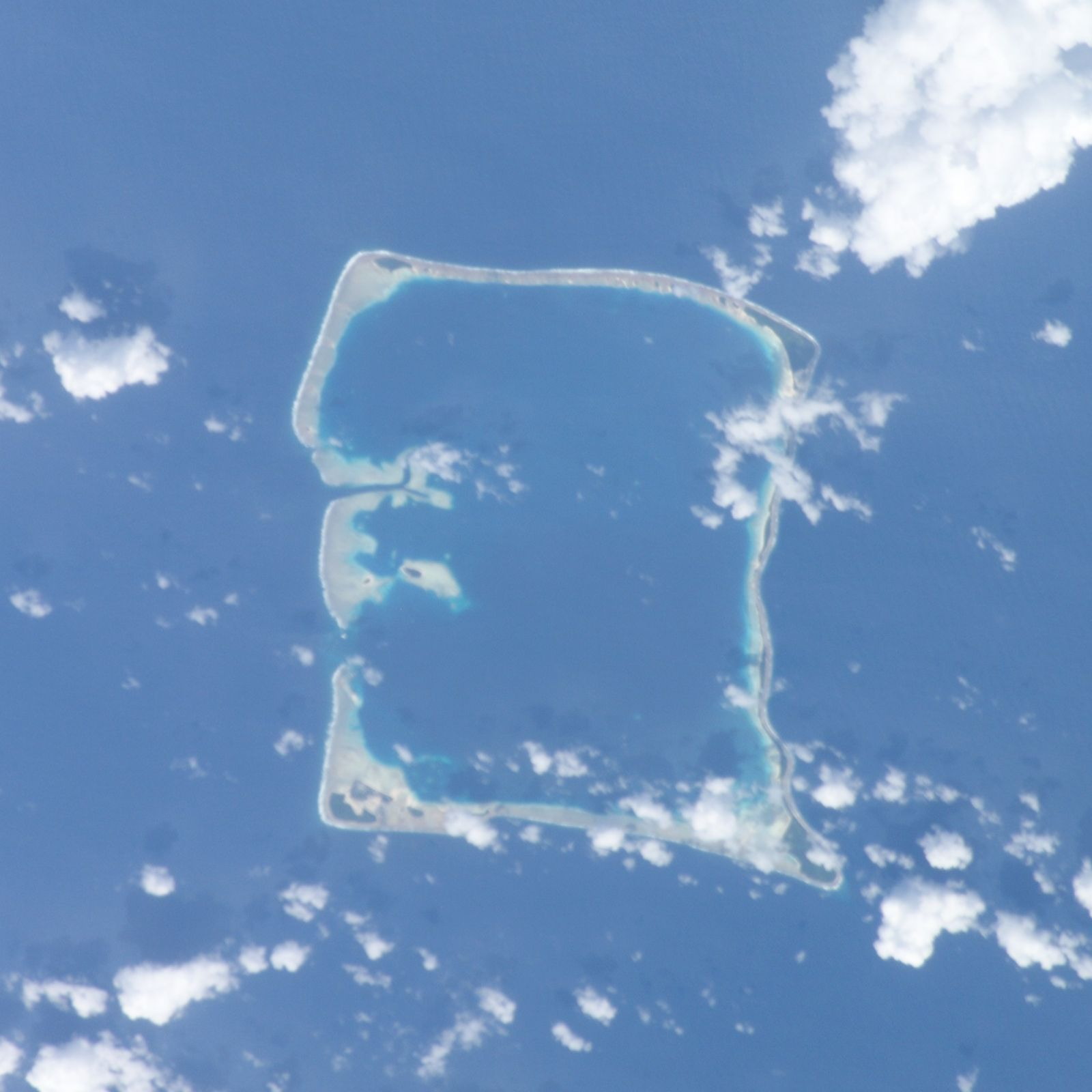

Motuloa is an islet on the east side of Nukufetau atoll, Tuvalu.
