= Teafuaniua =

Island in Nukufetau atoll, Tuvalu

Coordinates: 7.9553°S 178.4248°E

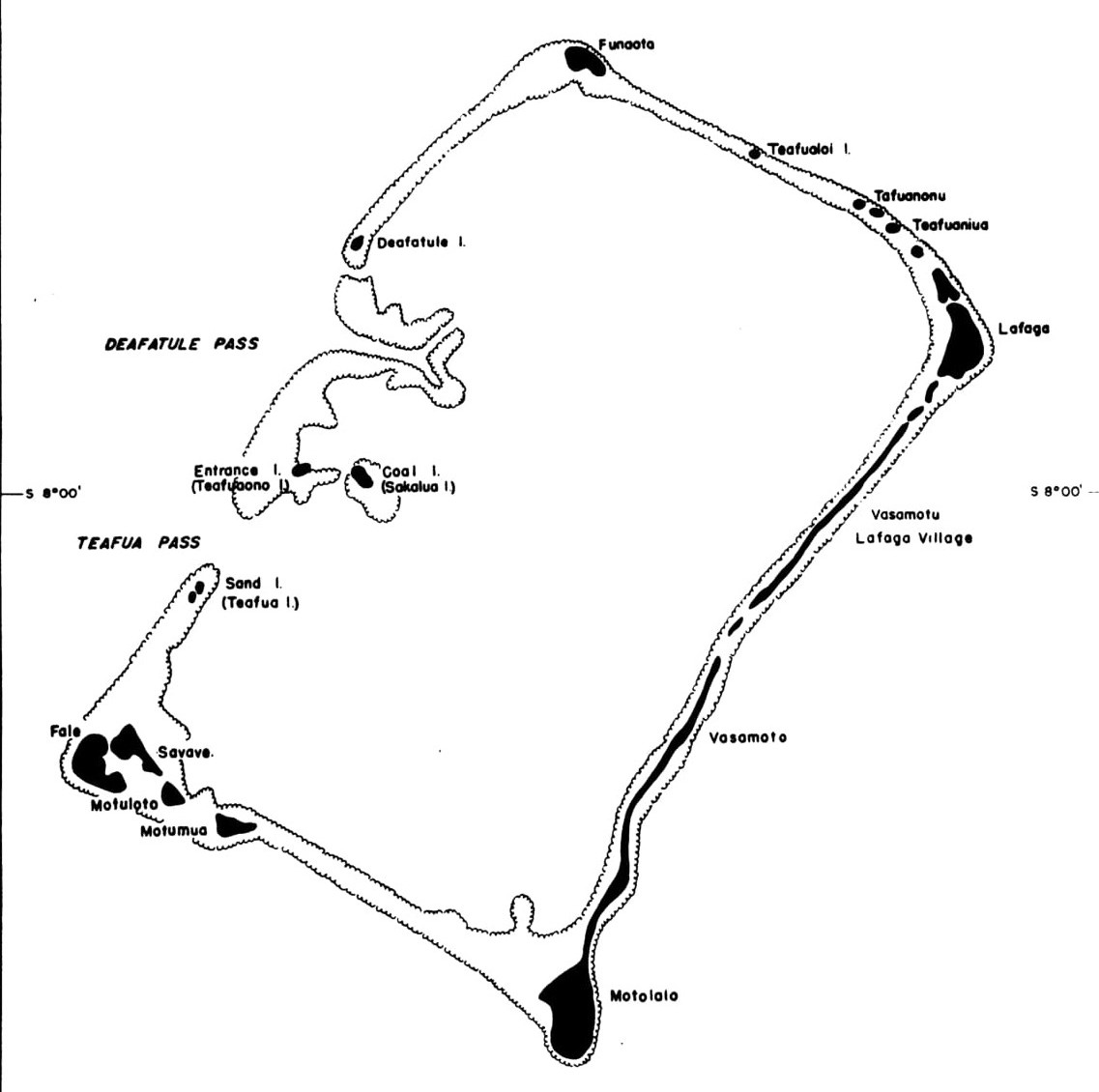
Map of Nukufetau with Teafuanuia on the north-east

Teafuaniua is an islet on the north-east of Nukufetau atoll, Tuvalu.
