= Fale, Tuvalu =

Islet in Nukufetau atoll, Tuvalu

Fale
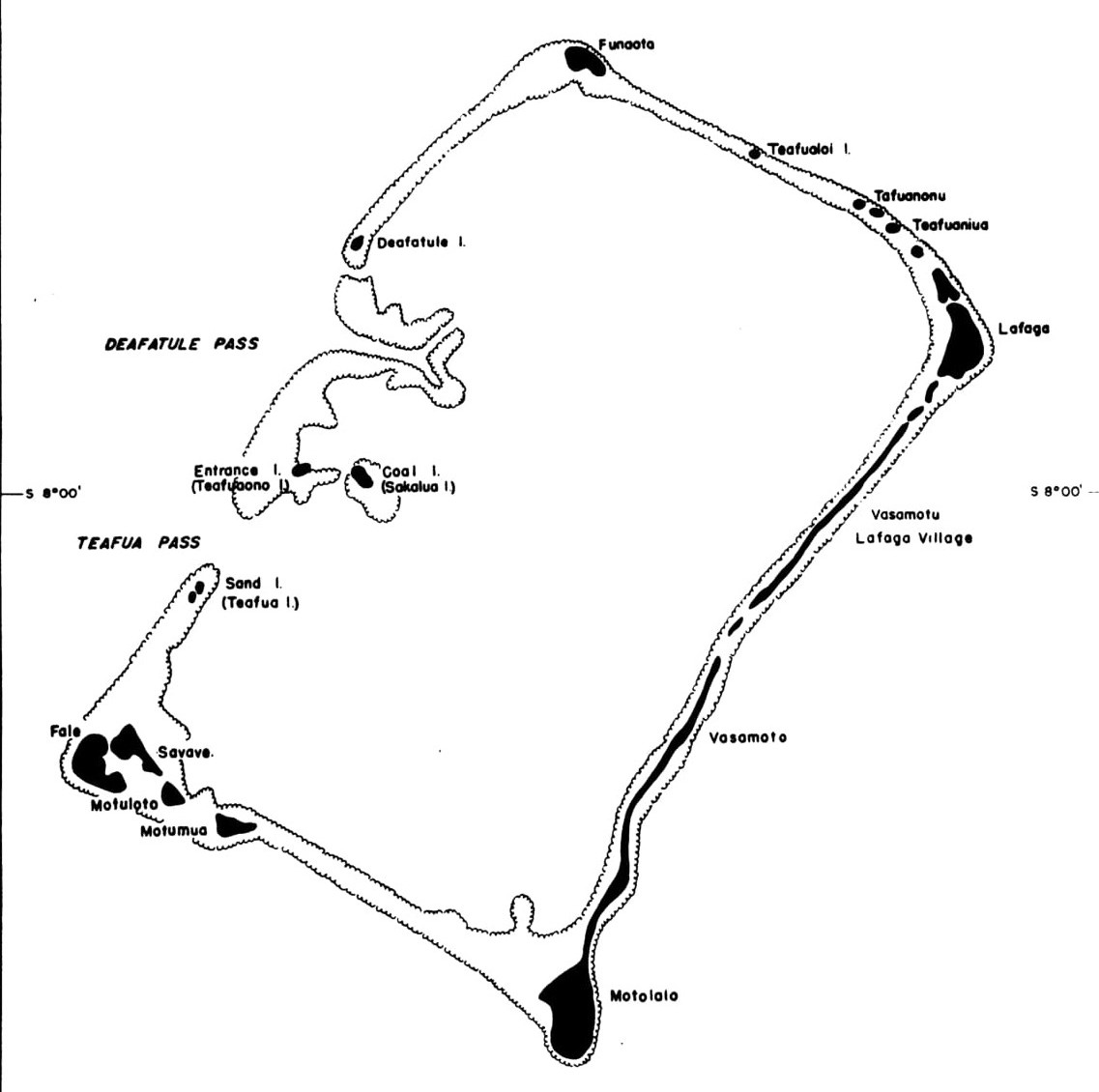
- Map of Nukufetau with Fale on the bottom left

Geography
- Coordinates: 8°02′S 178°18′E

Administration
- Tuvalu
- Atoll: Nukufetau

Fale is an islet of Nukufetau, Tuvalu. The traditional history of Nukufetau recalls that in order to protect the atoll from raiders from Tonga, Lagitupu and Laupapa, two aliki (chiefs) protected Fale. Lagitupu and Laupapa created a trap at a place still called Tututekolo, which was beside a path which led to the beach, where they would surprise the raiders and spear them or split their skulls with an axe made from shells.

In the late 19th century, after the coming of the missionaries, the people of Nukufetau lived on Fale before shifting to Savave, an islet on the lagoon side of the Fale and Laupapa settlement.

Historic grave sites have been found on Fale.

Food is grown on Fale, supplying to the main village on neighbouring Savave. The main products are pulaka (a root crop) and pigs.
