= VMA-331 =

Marine Attack Squadron 331
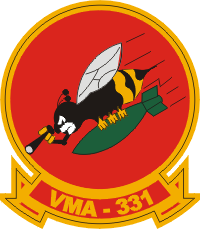
- VMA-331 Insignia
- Active: 1 Jan 1943 – 21 Nov 1945; 23 Apr 1952 – 1983; 1986 – 1 October 1992
- Country: United States
- Allegiance: United States of America
- Branch: United States Marine Corps
- Type: Attack squadron
- Role: Close air support Air interdiction
- Part of: Inactive
- Nicknames: Bumblebees; Doodlebugs (WWII)
- Tail Code: VL
- Engagements: World War II * Gilbert and Marshall Islands campaign Operation Desert Storm

Marine Attack Squadron 331 (VMA-331) was an attack squadron in the United States Marine Corps. The squadron, also known as the "Doodlebugs" and "Bumblebees," was part of Marine Aircraft Group 31, 2nd Marine Aircraft Wing and was based out of Marine Corps Air Station Beaufort, South Carolina. The squadron fought in World War II and Operation Desert Storm. It was decommissioned as part of the post Cold War drawdown of the US Military on 1 October 1992.

== History ==
=== World War II ===
Marine Scout Bomber Squadron 331 (VMSB-331) was formed on 1 January 1943 at Marine Corps Air Station Cherry Point, North Carolina. The squadron flew SBD Dauntless dive bombers. On 1 June 1943, the squadron's personnel and aircraft were divided to form VMSB-332. Also in June of that year the squadron moved and became the first unit to arrive at Bogue Field, North Carolina. This was followed by a move to San Diego in September to prepare for movement to the South Pacific. The squadron deployed overseas, finally arriving at Nukufetau Airfield on 15 November 1943. VMSB-331 operated from that island during the invasion of the Gilbert Islands. On 30 November 1943, the squadron sent a detachment to Tarawa to aid in patrol operations until 26 December 1943. In October 1944, the squadron was redesignated Marine Fighter Bomber Squadron 331 (VMBF-331), but they reverted to VMSB-331 on 30 December 1944. VMSB-331 remained the Pacific and carried out air strikes against by-passed Japanese positions in the Marshall Islands for the remainder of the war.

Following the war, VMSB-331 returned to the United States in October 1945 and was decommissioned quickly thereafter on 21 November 1945.

=== 1950s and early 1960s ===
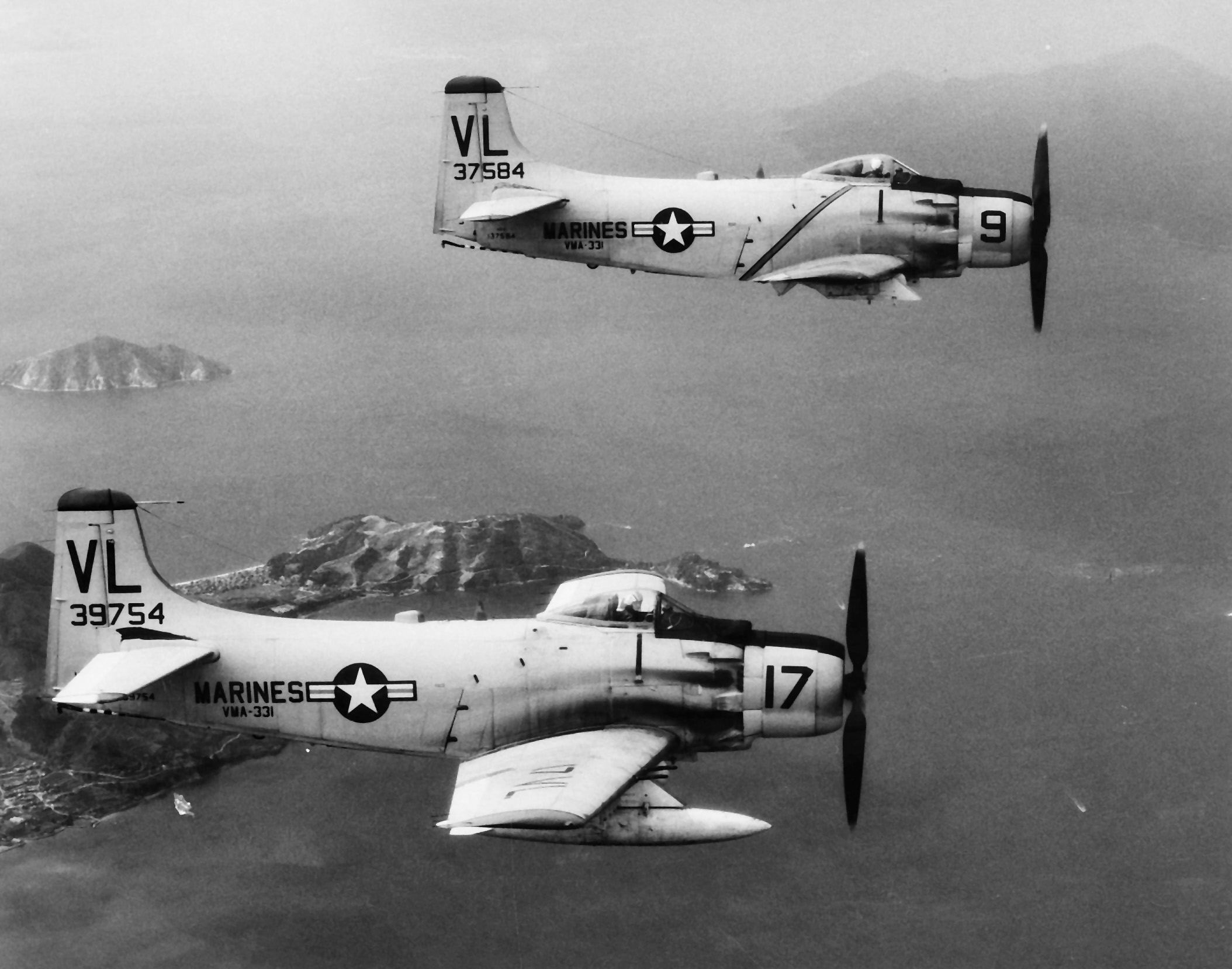
AD-6 Skyraider of VMA-331

VMA-331 was reactivated on 23 April 1952 at Marine Corps Air Station Miami, Florida. In 1959, VMA-331 was the last squadron in the Marine Corps to deploy overseas while flying the A-4D "Skyhawk". From May to August 1960, VMA-331 took part in a 3-month training exercise in the Caribbean in which squadron pilots flew more than 2,200 flight hours, dropped more than 485,000lbs of rockets, and fired 2645 rockets. VMA-331 deployed to Guantanamo Bay, Cuba during the Bay of Pigs Invasion and Roosevelt Roads, Puerto Rico during the blockade of Cuba. Two Skyhawks were lost during a two plane section take-off the day the squadron left MCAS Beaufort for the Caribbean. A very gusty cross-wind blew the lead aircraft into the wingman. At Guantanamo Bay, a Skyhawk making a low-level practice gunnery run hit the base perimeter fence. Another Skyhawk had a flameout when turning base on approach into Beaufort, South Carolina. .

=== Mediterranean Cruise (June 1970 - January 1971) ===
On 23 June 1971, VMA-331 deployed with 20 A-4E Skyhawks onboard the USS Independence (CVA-62) for seven-month Mediterranean cruise as part of Carrier Air Wing Seven. They first sailed to Puerto Rico where conducted its operational readiness inspection and also took part in the sinking of the USS Otter (DE-210) on 10 July 1970. After participating in PHIBLEX 2-71 and the squadron’s first Combat Readiness Assessment Exercise, the squadron sent a detachment to Naval Air Station Sigonella in early August 1970. The planes recovered back to the Independence in late August and were quickly turned and sent to Souda Bay, Crete to act aggressors for Exercise National Week VIII. In October the squadron participated in NATO Exercise Deep Express near Alexandroupoli, Greece in the Aegean Sea. During the course of the exercise, on 17 October, the squadron was visited by Commandant of the Marine Corps Leonard F. Chapman Jr. and Commanding General of the 2nd Marine Aircraft Wing, MajGen George C. Axtell.

On the second half of the deployment the squadron took part in two Carrier Air Wing Exercises (CAWEX) simulating strikes against the USS John F. Kennedy (CV-67). Mid-December saw participation in PHIBLEX 6-71 near Teulada, Sardinia. During the course of this deployment the ‘’Independence made port calls in Naples, Sardinia, Malta, Athens, Taranto, Barcelona, Cannes and Valencia. The squadron returned to Naval Air Station Norfolk, Virginia on 30 January 1971 and the next day all personnel were transported back to MCAS Beaufort.

=== 1980s, the Gulf War and deactivation ===
On 25 January 1985, VMA-331 became the first fully operational AV-8B Harrier II squadron in Marine Corps service. The squadron deployed on the USS Nassau (LHA-4) to the Persian Gulf and eventually flew 243 sorties, dropping 256 tons of ordnance, and became the first Marine Attack Squadron to conduct combat operations from a Landing Helicopter Assault ship. While supporting Operation Desert Storm, an AV-8B Harrier II from the squadron was shot down by an SA-7 over Safwan, Iraq on 27 February 1991. The pilot, Capt Reginald C. Underwood, was killed in action.

== Notable former members ==
- Charles O. Hobaugh – NASA astronaut

== See also ==
- United States Marine Corps Aviation
- List of active United States Marine Corps aircraft squadrons
- List of decommissioned United States Marine Corps aircraft squadrons
