= Lafanga =

Island in Nukufetau atoll, Tuvalu

Coordinates: 7.9719°S 178.4356°E

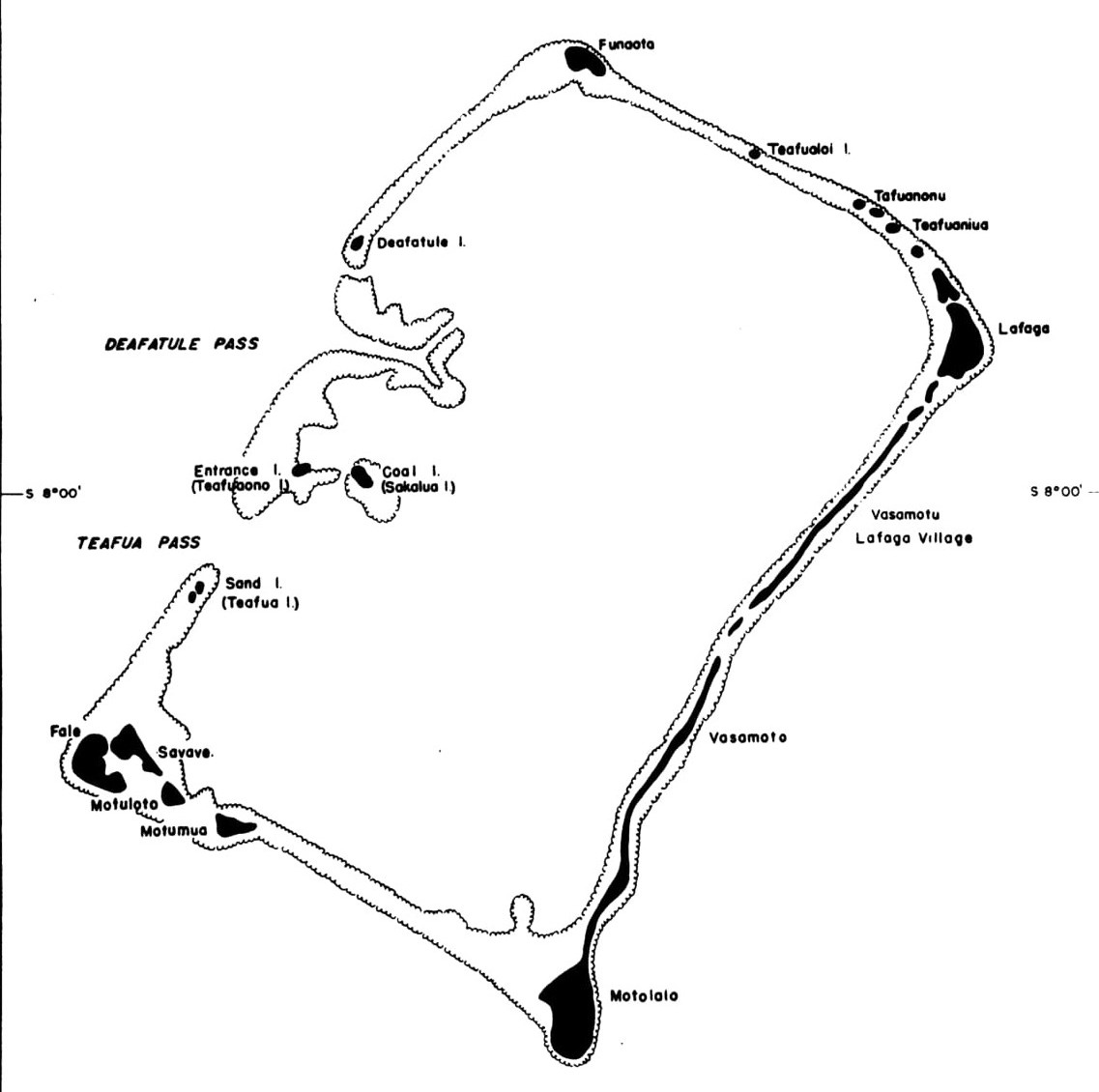
Map of Nukufetau with Lafanga on the top right

Lafanga or Lafaga is an islet of Nukufetau, Tuvalu. The traditional history of Nukufetau recalls that in order to protect the atoll from raiders from Tonga, Fialua, an Aliki (chief), was given Lafanga, which is the largest of the eastern islets of Nukufetau. Fialua would attack raiders with his club and bury the bodies at a place called Temata.
