= List of villages and neighbourhoods in Tuvalu =

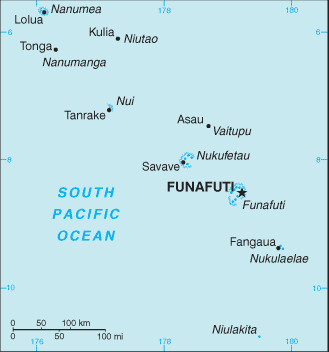
A map of Tuvalu, displaying islands, atolls, and some settlements

The following is a list of villages and neighbourhoods of Tuvalu and their populations.

Name	Island or atoll	Population (2022)
Alamoni - Maiaki	Nui	327
Alapi	Funafuti	1,115
Amatuku	Funafuti	74
Apalolo - Saniuta	Vaitupu	225
Asau	Vaitupu	148
Aulotu	Funafuti	360
Fakaifou	Funafuti	1,258
Funafala	Funafuti	99
Hauma	Nanumea	78
Haumaefa	Nanumea	174
Kulia	Niutao	345
Lofeagai	Funafuti	1,165
Lolua	Nanumea	229
Maneapa	Nukufetau	221
Tanrake	Nui	187
Matagi	Nanumea	22
Matagi	Vaitupu	40
Mataluafata	Nanumea	70
Motufoua	Vaitupu	40
Niulakita	Niulakita	36
Nukualofa	Nukulaelae	102
Pepesala	Nukulaelae	239
Potufale	Vaitupu	208
Senala	Funafuti	1,014
Teava	Niutao	205
Tekavatoetoe	Funafuti	773
Temotu	Vaitupu	56
Teone	Funafuti	484
Tokelau	Nanumanga	202
Tumaseu	Vaitupu	253
Vao	Nanumea	37
