= Matagi (disambiguation) =

Matagi are traditional winter hunters of northern Japan.

Matagi may also refer to:

== Film ==
- Matagi, a 1982 film about the traditional winter hunters.

== Places ==
- Matagi Island in northern Fiji
- Ani-Matagi Station, a railway station in Akita Prefecture, Japan

=== Tuvalu ===
- Matagi, Vaitupu, on the island of Vaitupu
- Matagi, Nanumea, on the island of Nanumea

== Surname ==
- Faalavelave Matagi (born 1997), a Samoan football goalkeeper
- Suaia Matagi (born 1988), a New Zealand and Samoan rugby league footballer
