= Te Motu Olepa =

Island in Vaitupu atoll, Tuvalu

Coordinates: 7.4824°S 178.697°E

Map

Te Motu Olepa is an islet of Vaitupu, Tuvalu that is between the Isles of Mosana and Luasamotu.
