= Air Tuvalu =

Tuvaluan airline

- Founded: 2023
- Ceased operations: Never launched
- Hubs: Funafuti International Airport
- Fleet size: 1
- Parent company: Government of Tuvalu
- Headquarters: Funafuti, Tuvalu
- Key people: Christopher Langton (CEO)
- Employees: 25

Air Tuvalu was a proposed Tuvaluan airline meant to launch domestic flights within Tuvalu beginning in October 2023.

== History ==
It was the first government-owned airline in Tuvalu's history. On May 11, 2023, a 16-seat Twin Otter (T2-TV8) was delivered from Honolulu International Airport by CEO Christopher Langton and two co-pilots. After the delivery, a ceremony was held on Friday to mark its arrival. The airline was hoping to strengthen the intra-island connection between Tuvalu's airports and improve reliable domestic air service. It was headquartered in Funafuti. Tuvalu's government announced restoration plans for its aviation infrastructure and once the outer-lying island airstrips were updated, those destinations would become operational.

Operations did not commence and no information was given regarding the delay of the airline's startup. The website also stopped being maintained and displayed a white screen. Centre for Aviation (CAPA), of which Tuvalu is a member country, continues stating on its website that the airline was proposed, therefore not meant to launch.

== Destinations ==
Village	Airport	Notes
Funafuti (Vaiaku)	Funafuti International Airport	Hub
Lolua	Nanumea Airfield	Intended to begin October 2023
Savave	Nukufetau Airfield	Intended to begin October 2023
Apalolo - Saniuta	Vaitupu Domestic Runway	

== Fleet ==
Air Tuvalu fleet
Aircraft	Total	Orders	Passengers	Notes
de Havilland Canada DHC-6 Twin Otter	1	—	16	Never entered service
Total	1	—		
