= Pongalei =

Island in Nui atoll, Tuvalu

Coordinates: 7°14′10″S 177°9′50″E

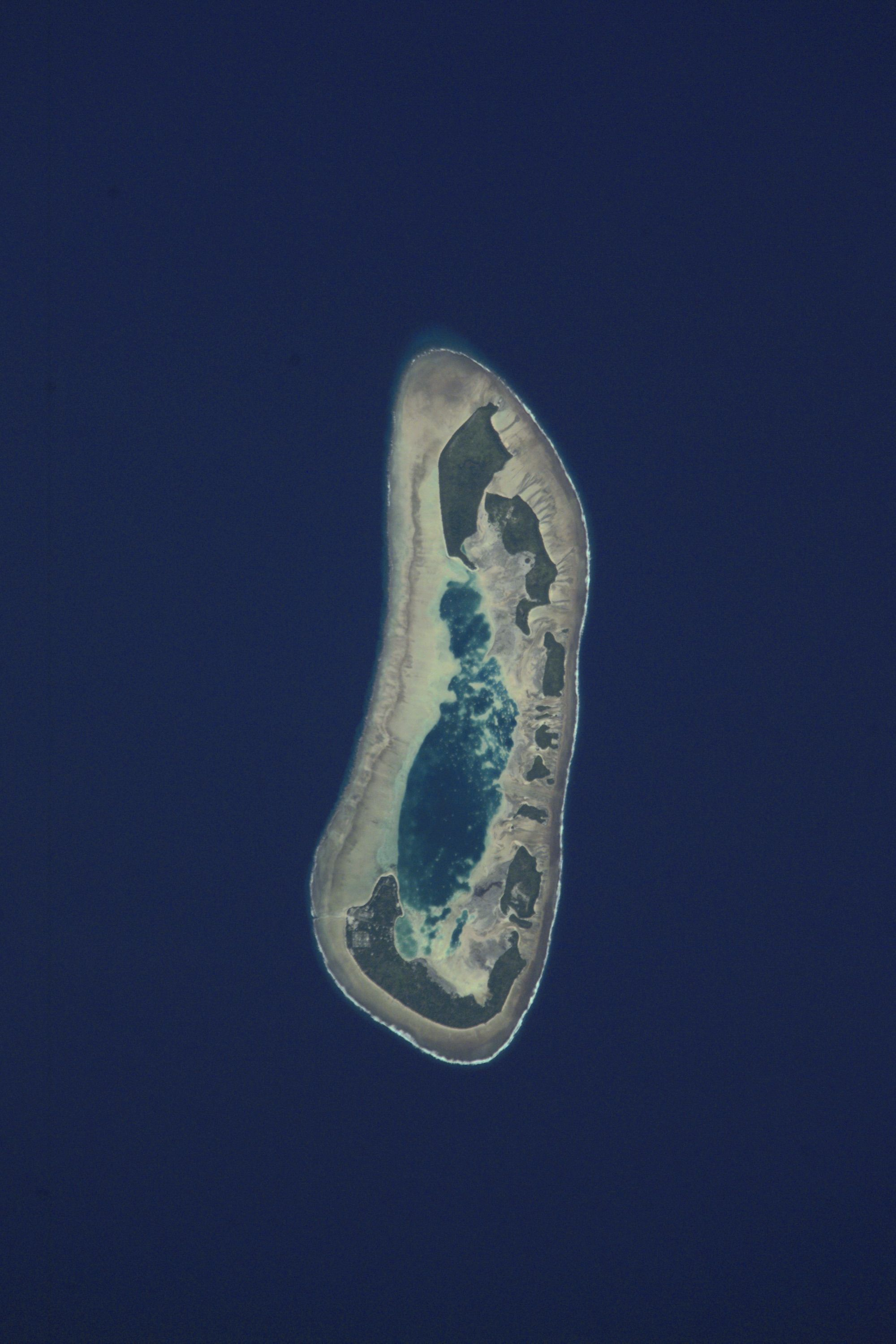
Nui atoll, Tuvalu, from space

Pongalei is an islet of Nui atoll in the Pacific Ocean state of Tuvalu.
