= Motufoua dormitory fire =

Deadly fire at Motufoua Secondary School

Motufoua Dormitory Fire
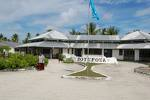
- Motufoua Secondary School
- Date: March 9, 2000
- Venue: Motufoua Secondary School
- Location: Vaitupu, Tuvalu; 7°29′24″S 178°41′37″E
- Also known as: Motufoua dorm fire, Tuvalu dorm fire
- Type: Fire
- Cause: accident
- Outcome: discussions about fire safety in Tuvalu; destruction of the Girl's Toalipi Dormitory; school policy changes
- Casualties: 19
- Burial: Vaitupu

The Motufoua Dormitory Fire occurred at night on March 9, 2000, at Motufoua Secondary School, a boarding school in Vaitupu, Tuvalu. It killed 18 schoolgirls and their matron. In the school's dormitory, which was locked and had wire mesh over the windows, a candle was knocked over and the fire spread, eventually causing a larger electrical fire.

== Fire ==
At night, the girl's dormitories at the boarding school were locked out, "to ensure that the boys are kept out from the girls." The dorms also have metal wire mesh over the windows.

A girl studying after lights-out in the Toalipi Girl's Dormitory, which was a very old wooden building, was using a candle as a light source. The girl had the candle in a cardboard box and a sheet over both it and her. At some point the girl ostensibly fell asleep and knocked over the candle, at which point she and the sheet would catch fire and she would throw the sheet at the light switch in an effort to escape being burned. This would cause a large electrical fire that spread through the entire dormitory.

The fire would claim the lives of 18 girls, aged 14 to 17. Their matron, a woman in her early forties, died trying to fight the fire and save the students. A further 18 girls escaped the building when two of them knocked down one of the doors.

== Aftermath ==
The event spurred discussion within Tuvalu about fire safety and training at schools. The school's policy was changed so that the girl's dormitories would be unlocked at night.

The girl's bodies were burned beyond recognition and could not be returned to their families. A mass burial was held on Vaitupu within 12 hours of their deaths, which the then prime minister, Ionatana Ionatana attended. Memorial services were held in Tuvalu and New Zealand.

The following year, a memorial service was held at the Grey Lynn Presbyterian Church in Auckland, which Tuvaluan leaders and the victim's parents attended. A memorial wall was erected at Motufoua Secondary School in memory of the 19 lives lost. The Tuvalu Philatelic Bureau also commemorated the event.

Opetaia Foa'i, of the Oceanian band Te Vaka, wrote a song about the fire titled "Loimata E Maligi," (English: Let the Tears Fall Down). The song "An Innocent Warrior," written for the movie Moana, was inspired by Loimata E Maligi.
