= Unimai =

- Location in Nui

Geography
- Location: South Pacific
- Coordinates: 7.2291°S 177.1627°E

Administration
- Tuvalu

Unimai is an islet of Nui atoll in the Pacific Ocean state of Tuvalu.
