= Telikiai =

Island in Nui atoll, Tuvalu

Coordinates: 7°11′50″S 177°8′52″E

Telikiai (or Meang) is an islet of Nui atoll in the Pacific Ocean state of Tuvalu. Meang means "west". The islet features in the legends of the Tekaunibiti family, whose members went to catch birds on the islet and found three teanti-ma-aomata (half-spirit and half-human creatures) and captured two.
