= Talalolae =

Island in Nui atoll, Tuvalu

Coordinates: 7°12′50″S 177°9′43″E

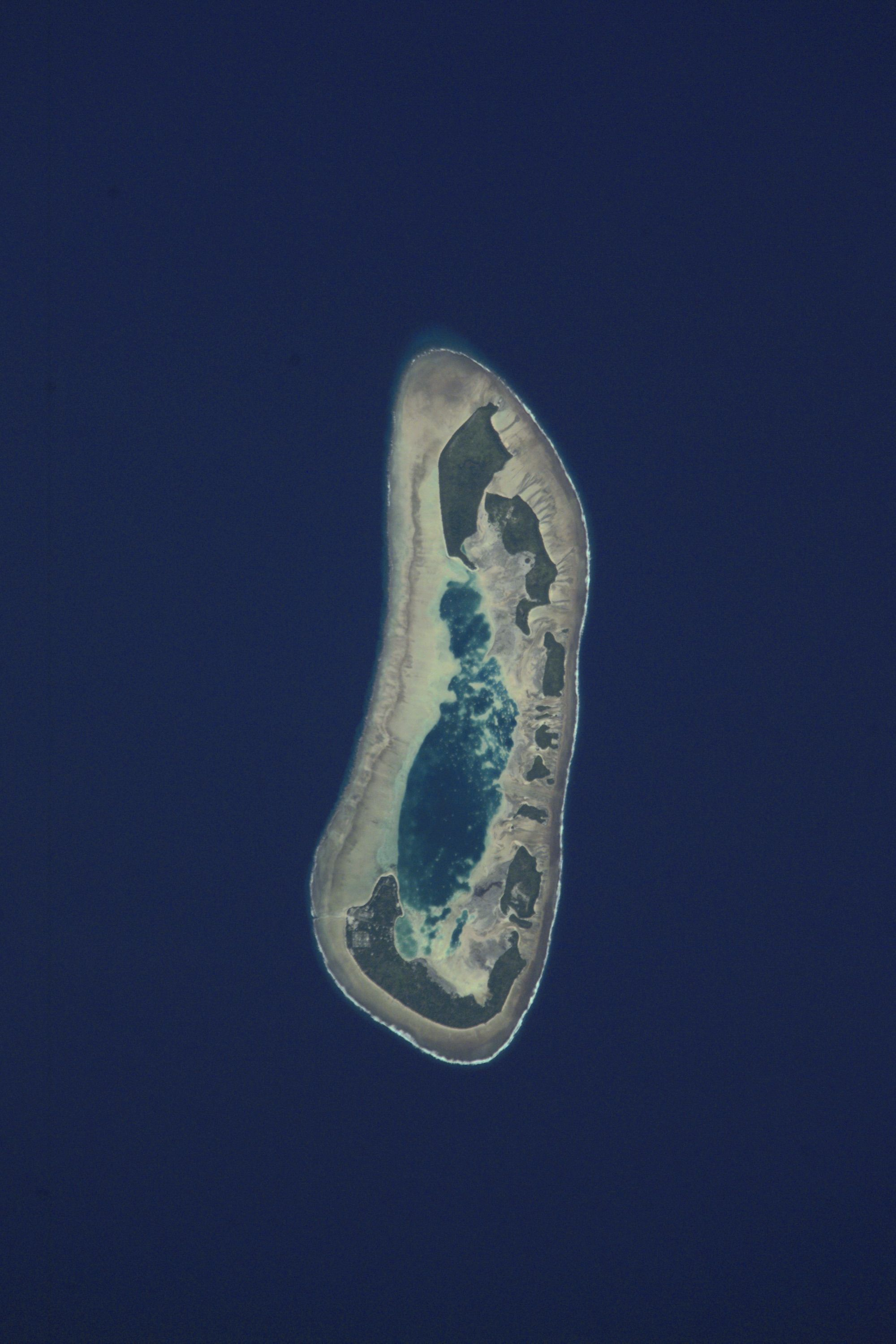
Nui atoll, Tuvalu, from space.

Talalolae is an islet located in Nui atoll in the Pacific Ocean state of Tuvalu.
