= Martin Kleis =

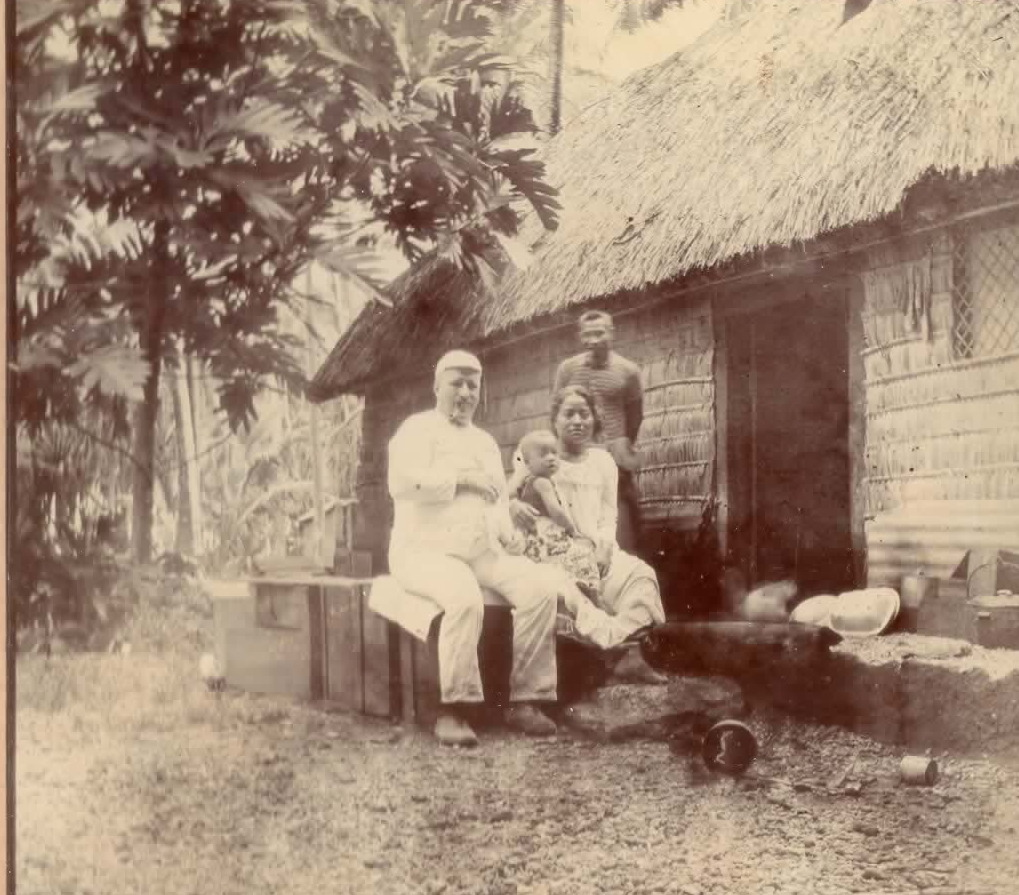
Martin Kleis (1850–1908) with Kotalo Kleis and their son Hans Martin Kleis (unidentified person at rear). Photo taken on Nui atoll, Ellice Islands.

Christian Martin Kleis (1850–1908), known as Martin Kleis, was born in Denmark and died in the Ellice Islands (Tuvalu). Kleis was the resident trader on Nui in the late 19th century.

Kleis sold copra to Henderson and Macfarlane. In 1892 Captain E.H.M. Davis of HMS Royalist reported on trading activities and traders on each of the Ellice Islands. The ship visited Nui on 29 July 1892. Captain Davis recorded in the ship’s journal that Kleis exported about 100 tons of copra in a good year.
