= Tokinivae =

Island in Nui atoll, Tuvalu

Coordinates: 7°12′5″S 177°9′20″E

Tokinivae is an islet of Nui atoll, in the Pacific Ocean state of Tuvalu. Nui tradition is that Kolaka, a warrior from Nukufetau came on several raiding expeditions to Tokinivae, until he was killed and buried at Tararorae.
