= Nui (atoll) =

Atoll and one of nine districts of Tuvalu

- Atoll
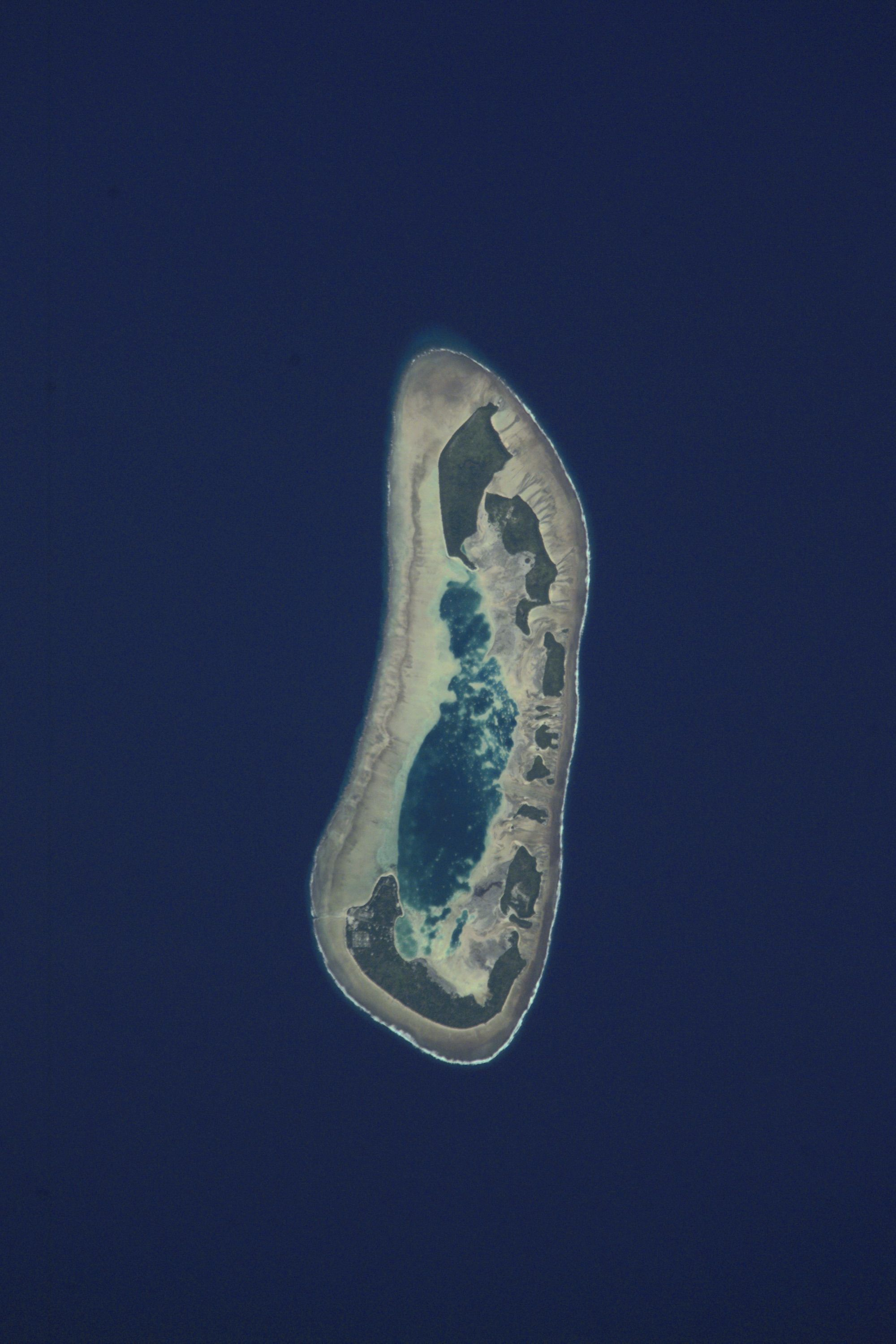
- Aerial view of Nui

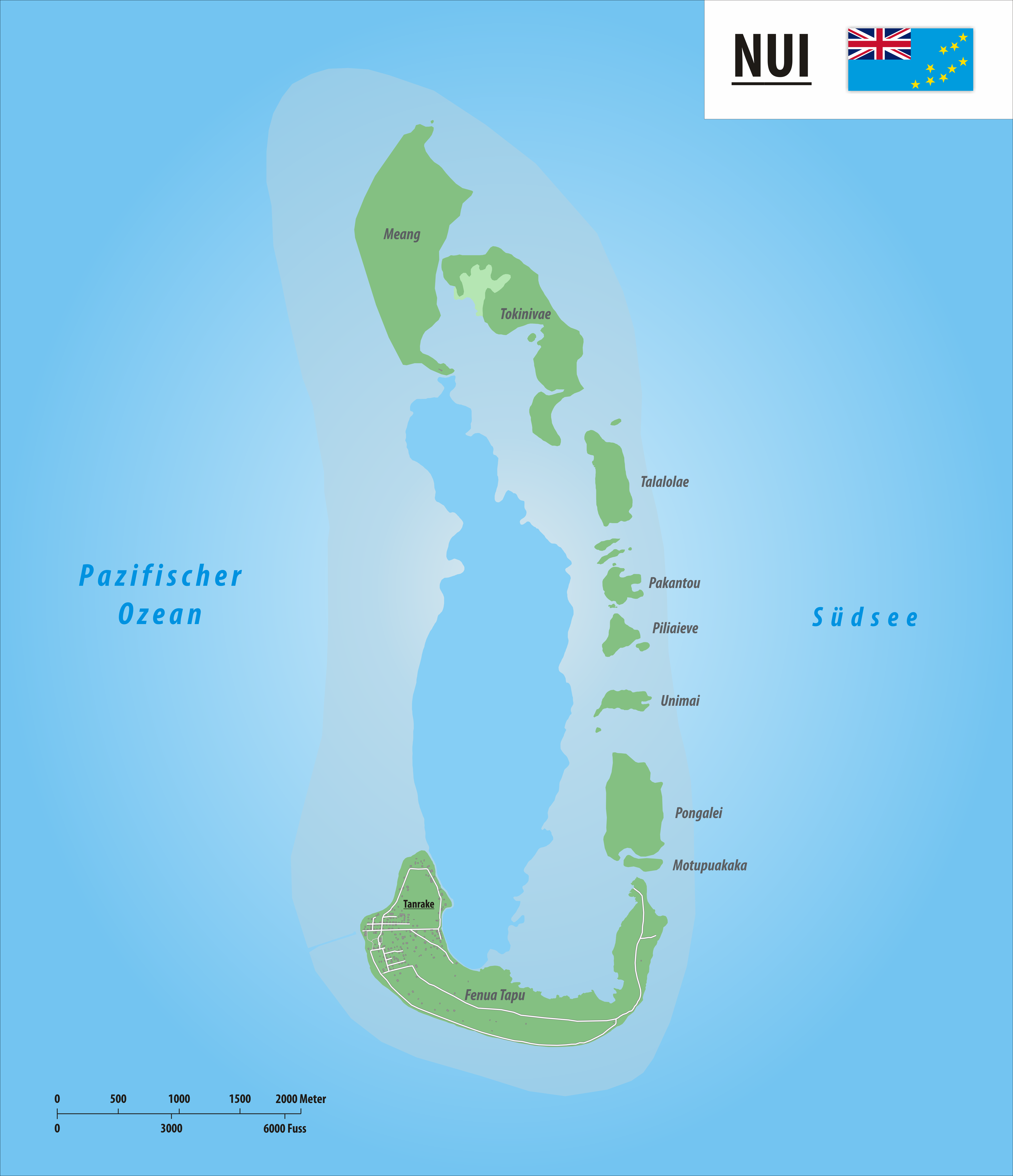
- Map of the atoll

- Location in Tuvalu
- Coordinates: 07°13′29″S 177°09′37″E
- Country: Tuvalu

Area
  - Total: 2.83 km^{2} (1.09 sq mi)

Population (2022)
  - Total: 514
  - Density: 182/km^{2} (470/sq mi)
- Demonym: Nuian
- ISO 3166 code: TV-NUI

Nui is an atoll and one of nine districts of the Pacific Ocean state of Tuvalu. It has a land area of 3.37 km^{2} (1.31 sq mile)and a population of 514 (2022 Census).

Traditionally Nuian culture is organised in three family circles – Tekaubaonga, Tekaunimala and Tekaunibiti families. Most people live on the western end of Fenua Tapu. In the 2012 census, 321 people live in Alamoni – Maiaki and 221 people live in Manutalake – Meang (Tanrake). The junior school is Vaipuna Primary School.

== Geography ==
Nui consists of at least 21 islets. These are:

- Fenua Tapu
- Motupuakaka
- Pakantou
- Piliaieve
- Pongalei
- Talalolae
- Telikiai, also known as Meang
- Tokinivae
- Unimai
- and at least 12 other islands

The biggest, most southern and most eastern island is Fenua Tapu (area 1.38 km^{2}), which is followed by Telikiai (which is the most western islet), Tokinivae, Pongalei, Talalolae, Pakantou, Unimai, Piliaieve and Motupuakaka.

== Languages ==
The people of Nui speak the Gilbertese language, the language of Kiribati, and Tuvaluan, the official language of Tuvalu. The ancestors of Nui came from both Samoa and the Gilbert Islands in what is now Kiribati.

== Early history ==
The island was first sighted by Europeans on 16 January 1568 by Spanish navigator Álvaro de Mendaña, who named it Isla de Jesús (Spanish for "Island of Jesus") because it was discovered on the day following the feast of the Holy Name. There are no less than six accounts of this event, that of Mendaña himself being as follows:

"A little after nine o'clock in the morning, a lad called Trejo, being aloft, first sighted land upon the starboard side to the southwest...When we drew near, we found it so small that it was no more than six leagues in circumference. This island was very full of trees like palms; towards the north it had a reef, which entered the sea a quarter of a league, and towards the south was another smaller reef. On the west side it had a strand lying lengthways, with reefs in different parts. This is on the west side, for we could not go round the east side because of the weather. Taking this island from the sea outwards, it has the shape of two galleys, with a copse in the middle which appears like a fleet of ships"

Mendaña found the island inhabited and five canoes came nearly within bow shot of his ship, when their occupants raised their paddles and turned back with shouts. Mendaña thereupon ordered signals to be made to them with a white cloth to try to get them to return, instead of which they landed and in turn stuck up signals along the shore. At night one of the ships showed a light, it was copied by a fire, and when it was put out the fire extinguished also. Hernán Gallego, Mendaña's pilot, says the natives were "naked and mulattoes" and Pedro Sarmiento de Gamboa, cosmographer in the expedition reported that the island "had a large fishery". As it was late Mendaña decided to defer landing until the morning and kept the ships tacking all night. With the dawn, however, a strong westerly storm blew up, and although they tried all day to regain the island they were at length compelled to give up.

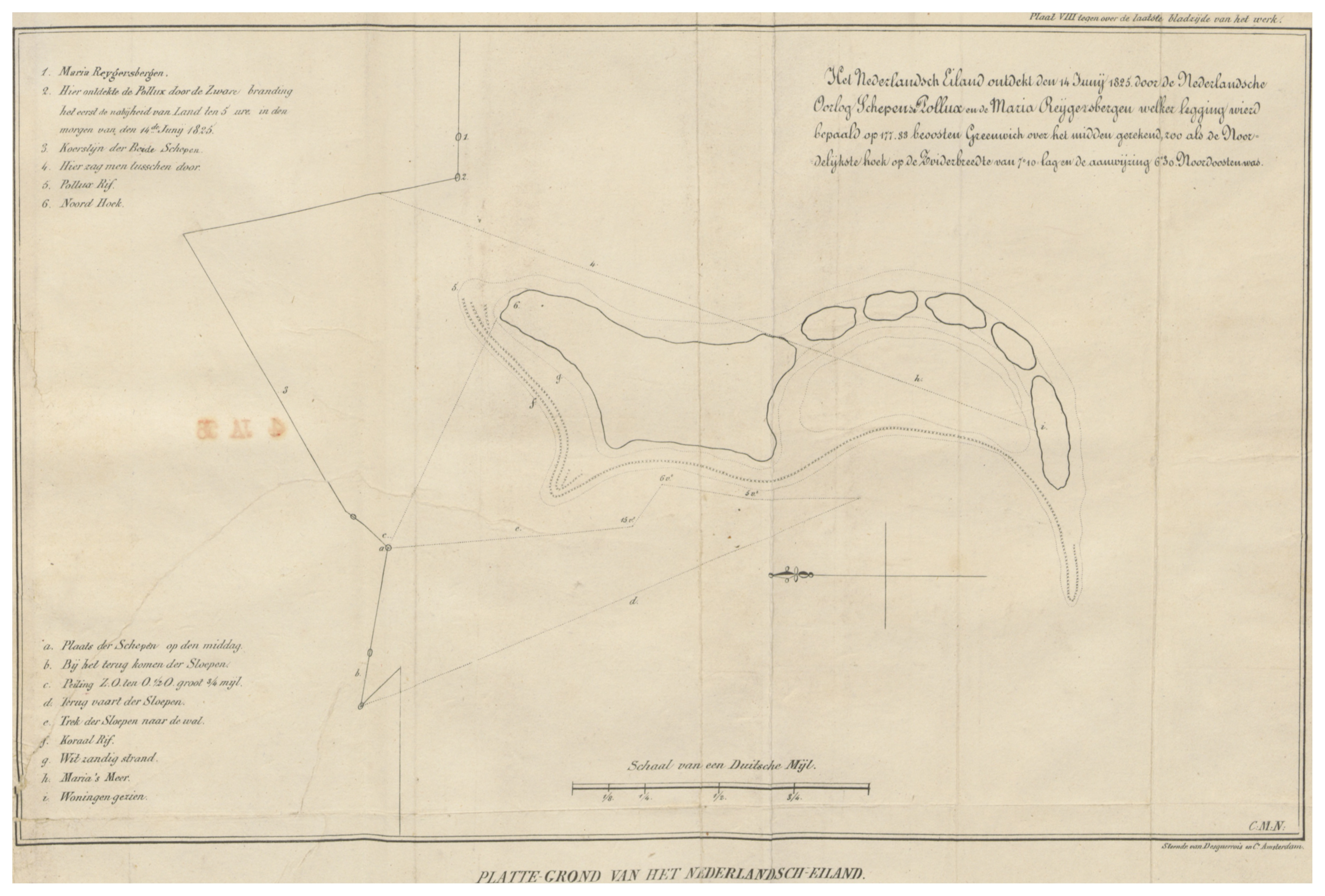
Dutch map of the island, made in June 1825

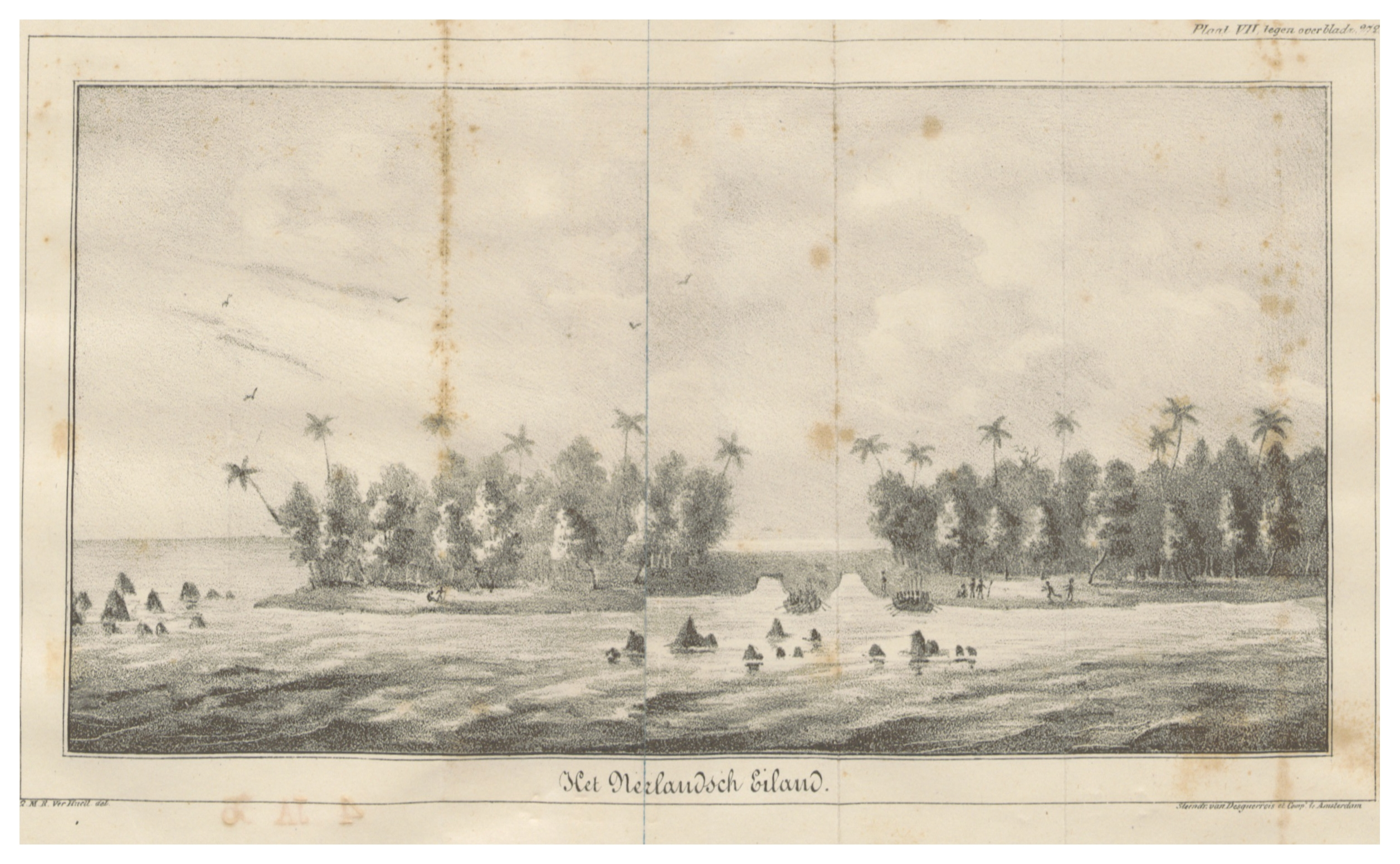
View of the main island

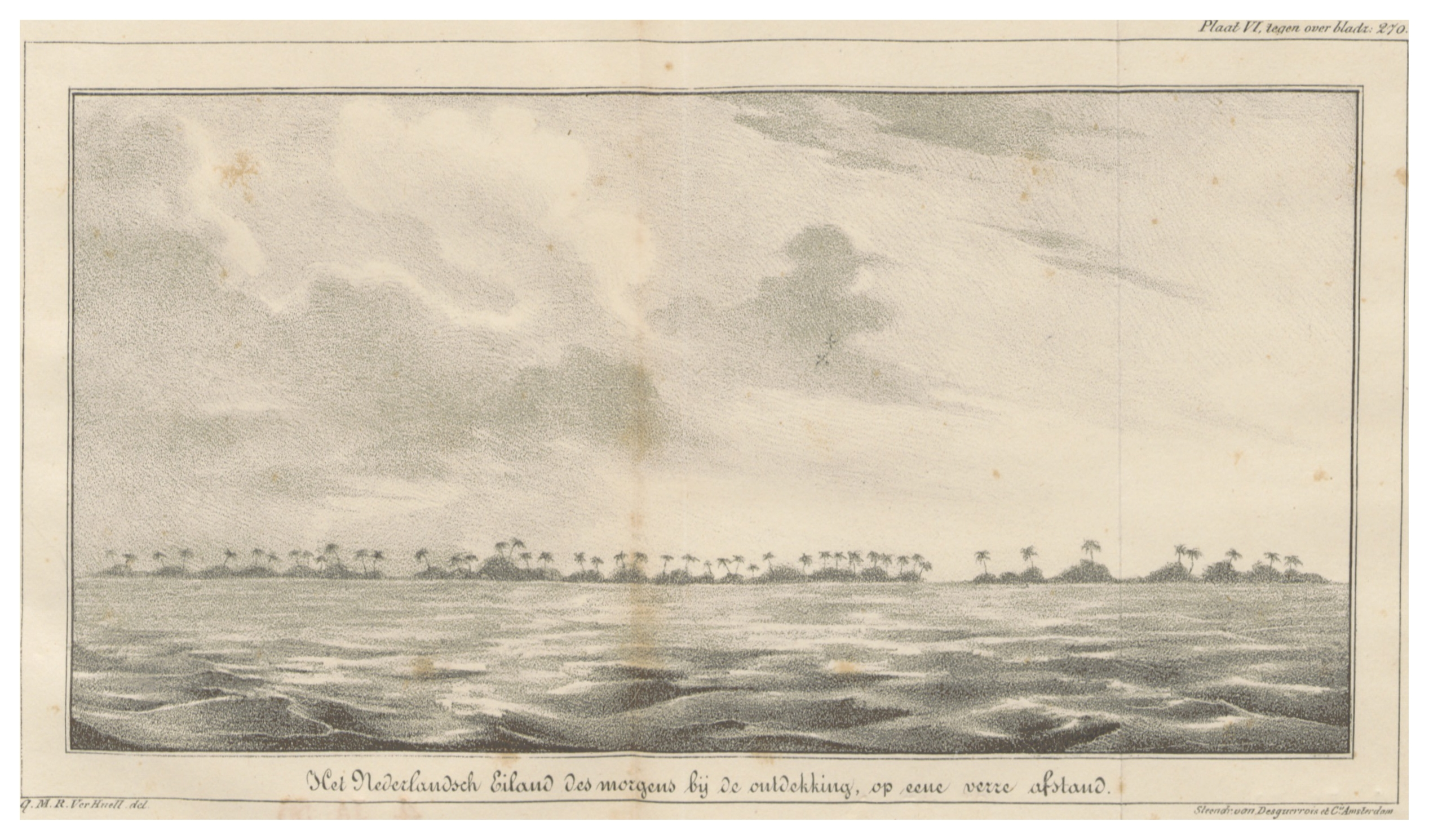
View of the atoll

A Dutch expedition (the frigate Maria Reijgersbergen) found Nui on the morning of 14 June 1825 and named the main island (Fenua Tapu) as Nederlandsch Eiland (Dutch Island). The atoll has been called Egg or Netherland Island.

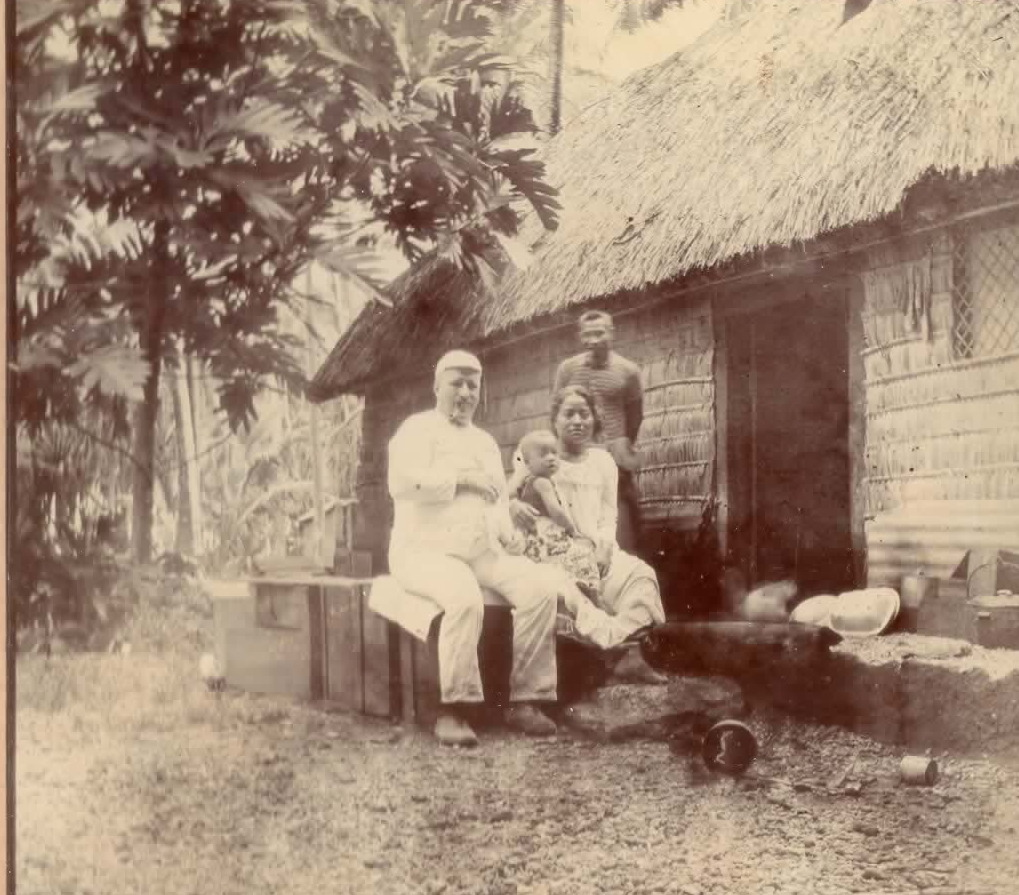
Martin Kleis (1850-1908) with Kotalo Kleis and their son Hans Martin Kleis.

The population of Nui from 1860 to 1900 is estimated to be between 250 and 300 people.

Kirisome, was Nui's first and long serving pastor (1865–99).

Robert Waters was an early trader on Nui in the 1850s-1860s. Martin Kleis was the resident trader on Nui in the late 19th century who sold copra to Henderson and Macfarlane.

The photographer Thomas Andrew visited Nui in about 1885–86.

Nui Post Office opened around 1919 and a climate station was established in 1941.

The traditional outrigger canoes (paopao) from Nui were constructed with an indirect type of outrigger attachment and the hull is double-ended, with no distinct bow and stern. These canoes were designed to be sailed over the Nui lagoon. The booms of the outrigger are longer than those found in other designs of canoes from the other islands. This made the Nui canoe more stable when used with a sail than the other designs.

Celebrations are held on Nui on 16 February – Bogin te Ieka (Day of the Flood) – to commemorate the Tsunami that struck the island on that day in 1882.

== Cyclone Pam, March 2015 ==
Nui was affected by storm surges caused by Cyclone Pam in early March 2015, which caused damage to houses, crops and infrastructure. On 22 March 71 families (40 per cent of the population) of Nui remained displaced and were living in 3 evacuation centres or with other families. The Situation Report published on 30 March reported that Nui suffered the most damage of the three central islands (Nui, Nukufetau and Vaitupu); with Nui suffering the loss of 90% of the crops. Health assessment teams visited Nui and the other islands affected by Cyclone Pam.

== General election, 2024 ==
Mackenzie Kiritome was re-elected and Sir Iakoba Taeia Italeli was elected to represent Nui in the parliament in the 2024 general election. Dr. Puakena Boreham was not re-elected.

Nui constituency results
Party	Candidate	Votes	%
Nonpartisan	Mackenzie Kiritome	352	36.90
Nonpartisan	Sir Iakoba Italeli	311	32.60
Nonpartisan	Dr. Puakena Boreham	291	30.50

== Notable local people ==
Sir Iakoba Italeli (GCMC) was the Governor-General of Tuvalu from 16 April 2010 until 22 August 2019. He represented Nui in the Parliament from 2006 until he was appointed the Governor-General. He was the Minister of Education, Sports and Health in the Ielemia Ministry. He was again elected an MP in the 2024 general election and was appointed the Speaker of the Parliament.

Alesana Kleis Seluka (MBE, CBE) is medical doctor by profession and Chairman of the Public Service Commission of Tuvalu. He has represented Nui in the parliament. He served as the Minister of Finance and Economic Planning from 1996 until 1999, and Minister of Health from 2001 to 2006.

Pelenike Isaia became the second woman ever to have sat in the Parliament of Tuvalu, she became an MP in the 2011 by-election following the death of her husband Isaia Taeia Italeli. She represented Nui until the 2015 Tuvaluan general election.

Mamao Keneseli is a community development leader on Nui, where she became involved with running a women's handicraft centre in 1990, teaching women how to develop their skills and earn a living. From 2010 to 2017 she was the director of the Matapulapula Women's Group.
