= Motupuakaka =

Island in Nui atoll, Tuvalu

Coordinates: 7°14′25″S 177°9′52″E

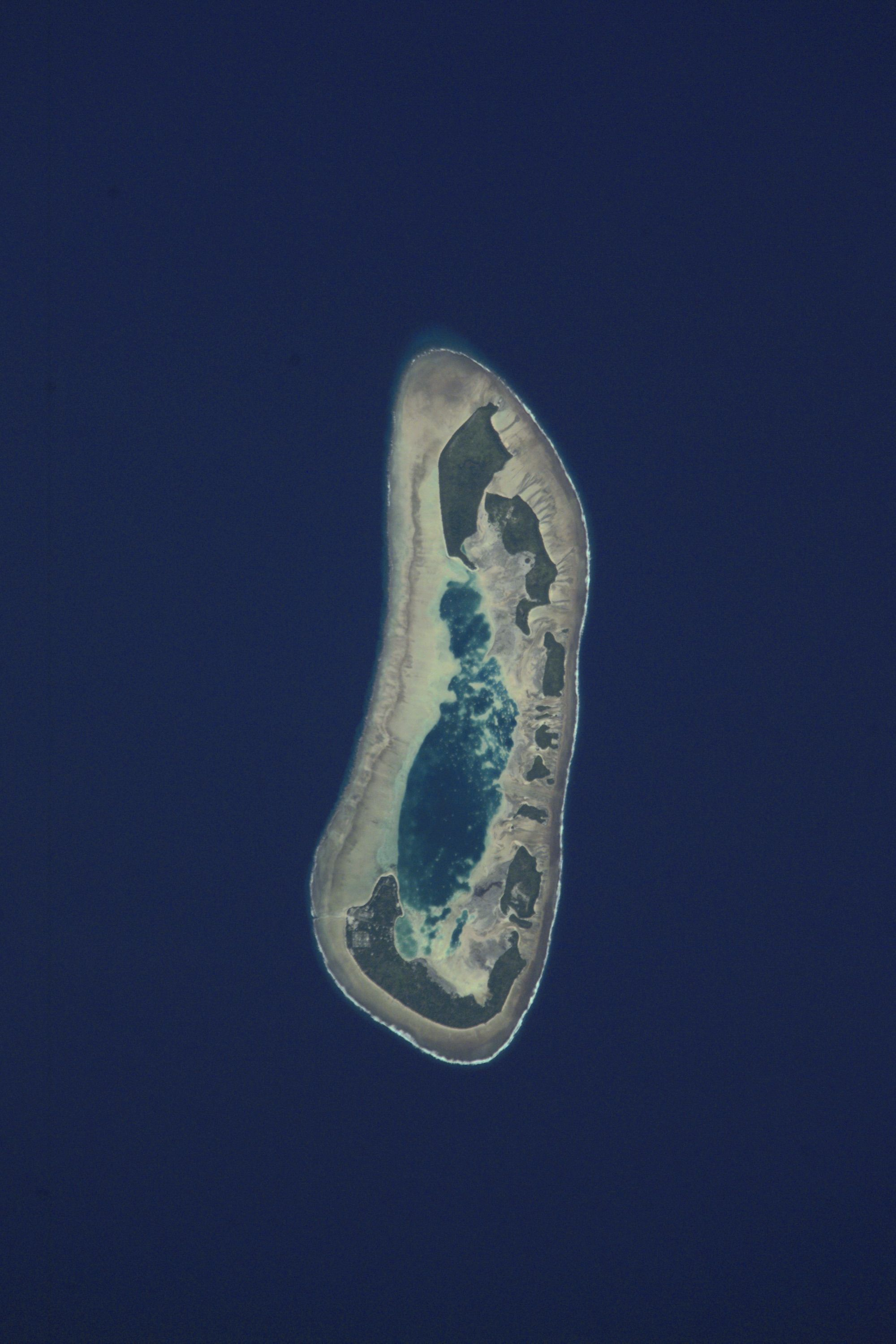
The Nui Atoll from space

Motupuakaka is an islet of Nui atoll in the Pacific Ocean state of Tuvalu.
