= Alamoni - Maiaki =

- Village and island
- Location in Tuvalu
- Coordinates: 7.2498°S 177.1516°E
- Country: Tuvalu
- Atoll: Nui

Population
  - Total: 327

Alamoni - Maiaki is a village and island in Nui atoll, Tuvalu. It has a population of 327.
