= Motufoua =

- Village
- Location in Tuvalu
- Coordinates: 7.4906°S 178.6934°E
- Country: Tuvalu
- Island: Vaitupu

Population
  - Total: 40

Motufoua is a village on the island of Vaitupu in Tuvalu. Its population is 40.
