= Motutanifa =

Islet in Vaitupu atoll, Tuvalu

Coordinates: 7.4687°S 178.6789°E

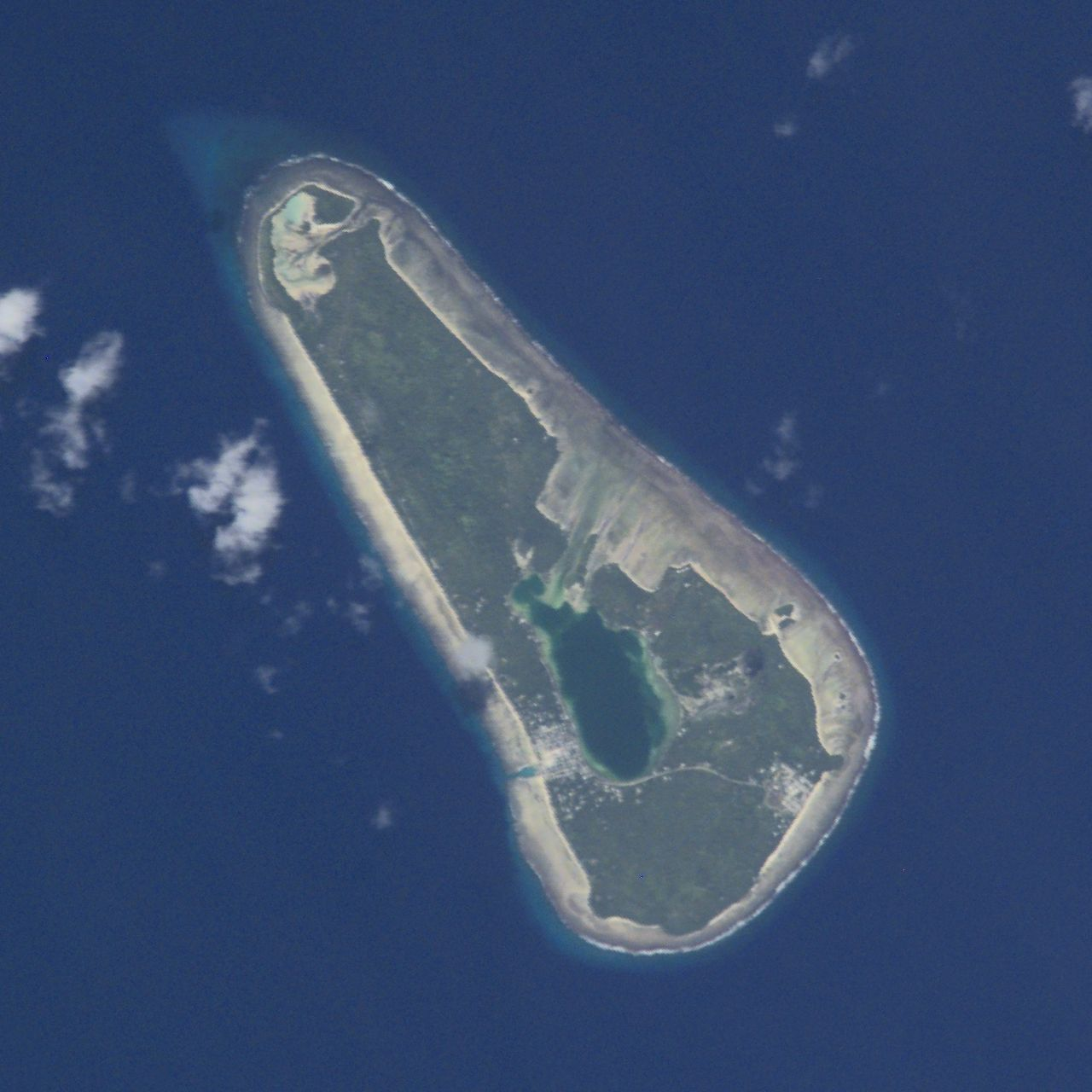
Satellite view of Vaitupu atoll in Tuvalu, where the uninhabited islet of Motutanifa is located.

Motutanifa or Motu o tanifa is an uninhabited islet of Vaitupu, Tuvalu, which is located on the reef to the north of the part of Vaitupu known as Muli.

== See also ==
- Desert island
- List of islands
