= Aquaculture in Tuvalu =

Aquaculture in Tuvalu generally centers on milkfish and clams. The first pond in Tuvalu purposely built to sustain aquaculture was completed in 1996 on Vaitupu. The construction of this 1560-square-metre pond was funded under the FAO Regional South Pacific Aquaculture Development Project.
