= Potufale =

- Village
- Location in Tuvalu
- Coordinates: 6.1082°S 177.33424°E
- Country: Tuvalu
- Island: Vaitupu

Population
  - Total: 208

Potufale is a village on the island of Vaitupu in Tuvalu. It has a population of 208.
