= Pakantou =

Island in Nui atoll, Tuvalu

Coordinates: 7°13′16″S 177°9′45″E

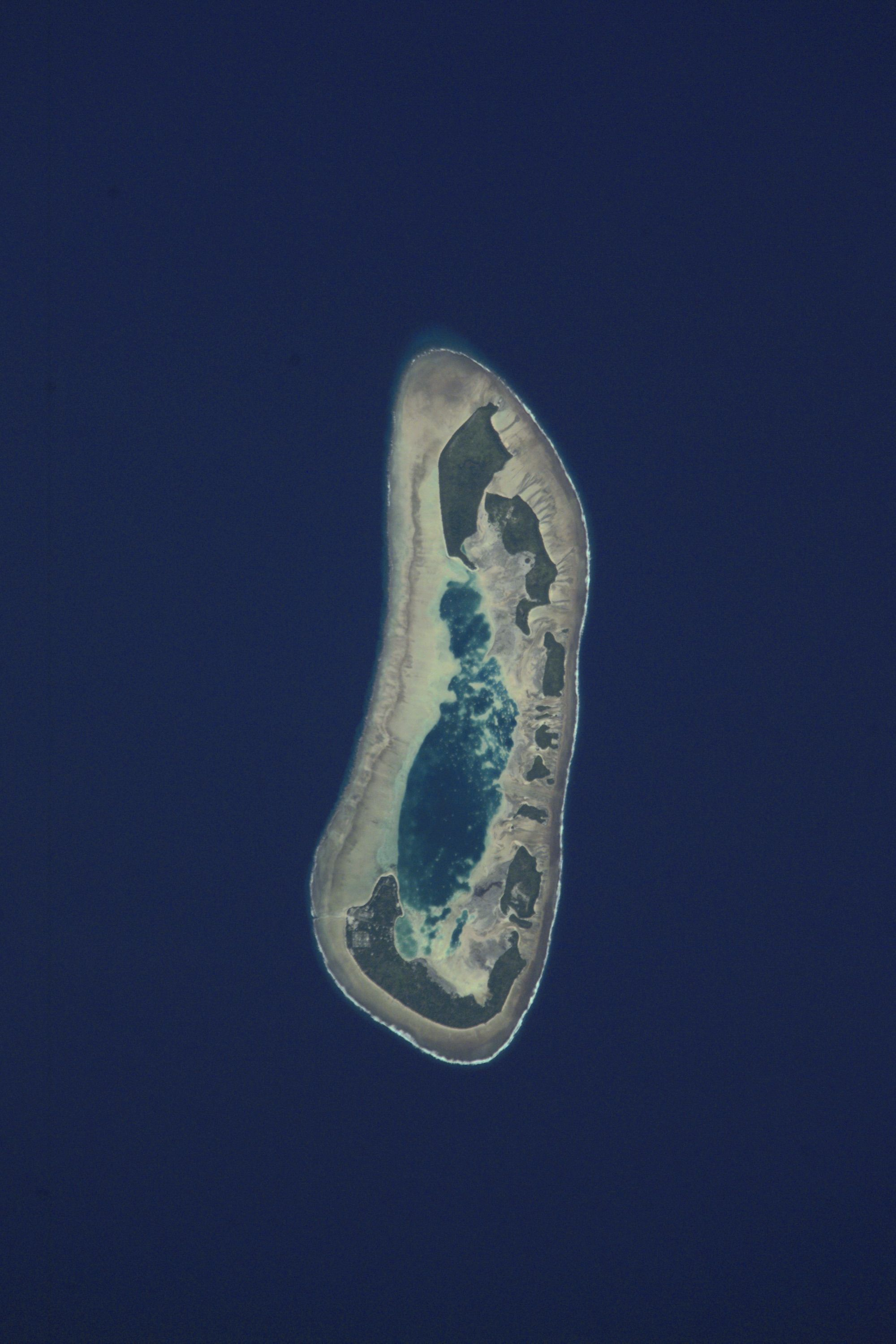
Nui atoll, Tuvalu

Pakantou is an islet of Nui atoll in the Pacific Ocean state of Tuvalu.
