= Tofia =

Island in Vaitupu atoll, Tuvalu

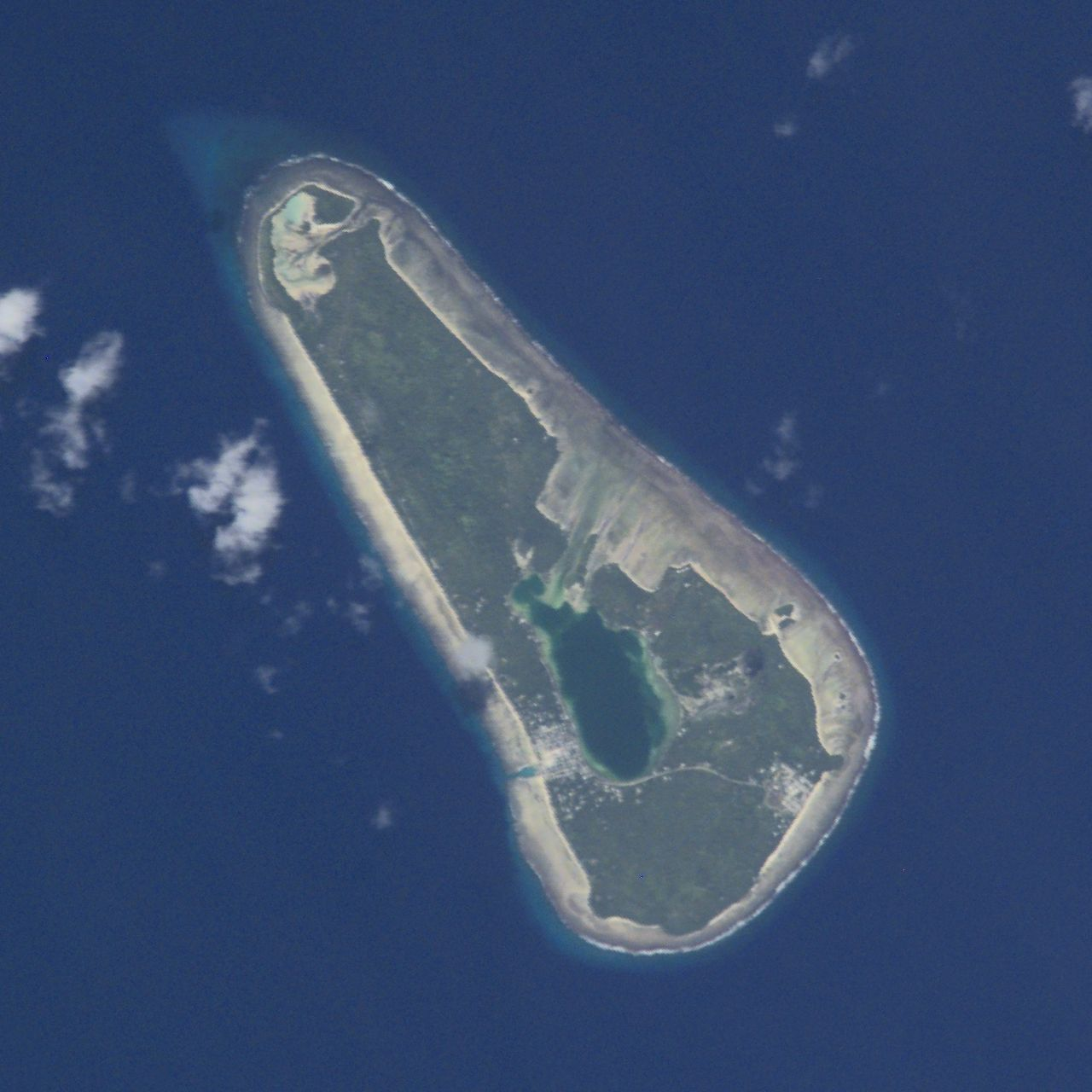
- Vaitupu atoll from space (Tofia visible in the center)

- Location within Oceania

Geography
- Location: Oceania
- Coordinates: 7°28′41″S 178°40′54″E
- Archipelago: Vaitupu
- Area: 34,962 m^{2} (376,330 sq ft)
- Highest elevation: 1 m (3 ft)

Administration
- Tuvalu

Tofia is a small islet of Vaitupu, Tuvalu, in the entrance to the lagoon.

== Geography ==
Tofia is one of at least nine islands of Vaitupu atoll and is the second largest one, only behind the Vaitupu island itself. The islet is positioned in the entrance to the lagoon. Due to its position, it is exposed to the accumulative and erosive effects of the ocean. Tofia has a sand bar deposit which is infilled from the oceanic transport.

In 2010, the islet was planted with mangroves and developed into a mangrove stand. The planting of the same trees was continued in 2020. Apart from the sandy banks, the entire area of Tofia is covered in vegetation. The islet is uninhabited.

The approximate terrain elevation above sea level is 1 meter.
