= Motufoua Secondary School =

Location
- Vaitupu; Tuvalu; 7°29′24″S 178°41′37″E

Information
- Type: Boarding school
- Denomination: Church of Tuvalu
- Established: 1905
- Founder: Motufoua
- Headmaster: Fineaso Tehulu.
- Teaching staff: 55 (2012)
- Gender: Co-educational
- Enrollment: 385 (2022)

Motufoua Secondary School is a boarding school for children on Vaitupu atoll, Tuvalu. As of 2000 it is the largest high school in Tuvalu. As Tuvalu consists of nine islands, the students reside on Vaitupu during the school year and return to their home islands during the school vacations.

The school received worldwide attention in March 2000, when a fire in a dormitory at the school killed 19 girls and an adult supervisor. It was later discovered that the fire was caused by a student using a candle to read during the night. The school celebrated 100 years of education in 2005.

== Establishment ==
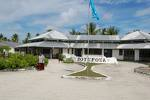
Motufoua Secondary School office

The London Missionary Society (LMS) established a primary school at Motufoua on Vaitupu in 1905. The purpose was to prepare young men for entry into the LMS seminary in Samoa. This school evolved into the Motufoua Secondary School.

The activities of the LMS were taken over by the Church of Tuvalu. From 1905 to 1963 Motufoua only admitted students from Church of Tuvalu schools. In 1963 the Church of Tuvalu and the administration of the Gilbert and Ellice Islands colony began to co-operate in providing education and students were enrolled from government schools. In 1970 a secondary school for girls was opened at Motufoua.

In 1974, the Ellice Islanders voted for separate British dependency status as Tuvalu, separating from the Gilbert Islands, which became Kiribati. The following year the Tuvaluan students who attended school on Tarawa were transferred to Motufoua. From 1975 the Church of Tuvalu and the government jointly administered the school. Eventually administration of Motufoua became the sole responsibility of the Department of Education of Tuvalu.

== Principals ==
Reverend Sir Filoimea Telito, GCMG, MBE started out as a teacher at Motufoua. After completing theological studies, he returned to Motufoua to serve as pastor. Later he became principal of Motufoua, and from April 2005 to March 2010 he was the Governor-General of Tuvalu.

The current principal is Mr. Fineaso Tehulu.

The previous principals include:

- Siautele Lito;
- Mosese G. Halofaki, an expatriate from the Republic of the Fiji Islands.

== Government school ==
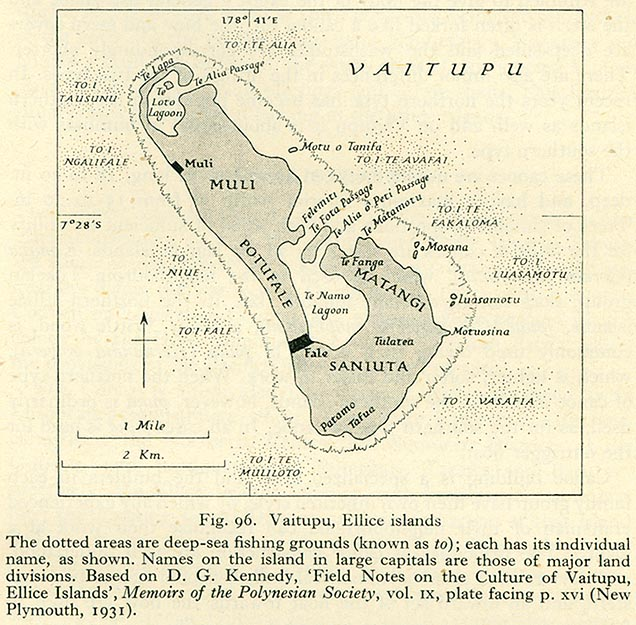
Motufoua Secondary School is located in Saniuta

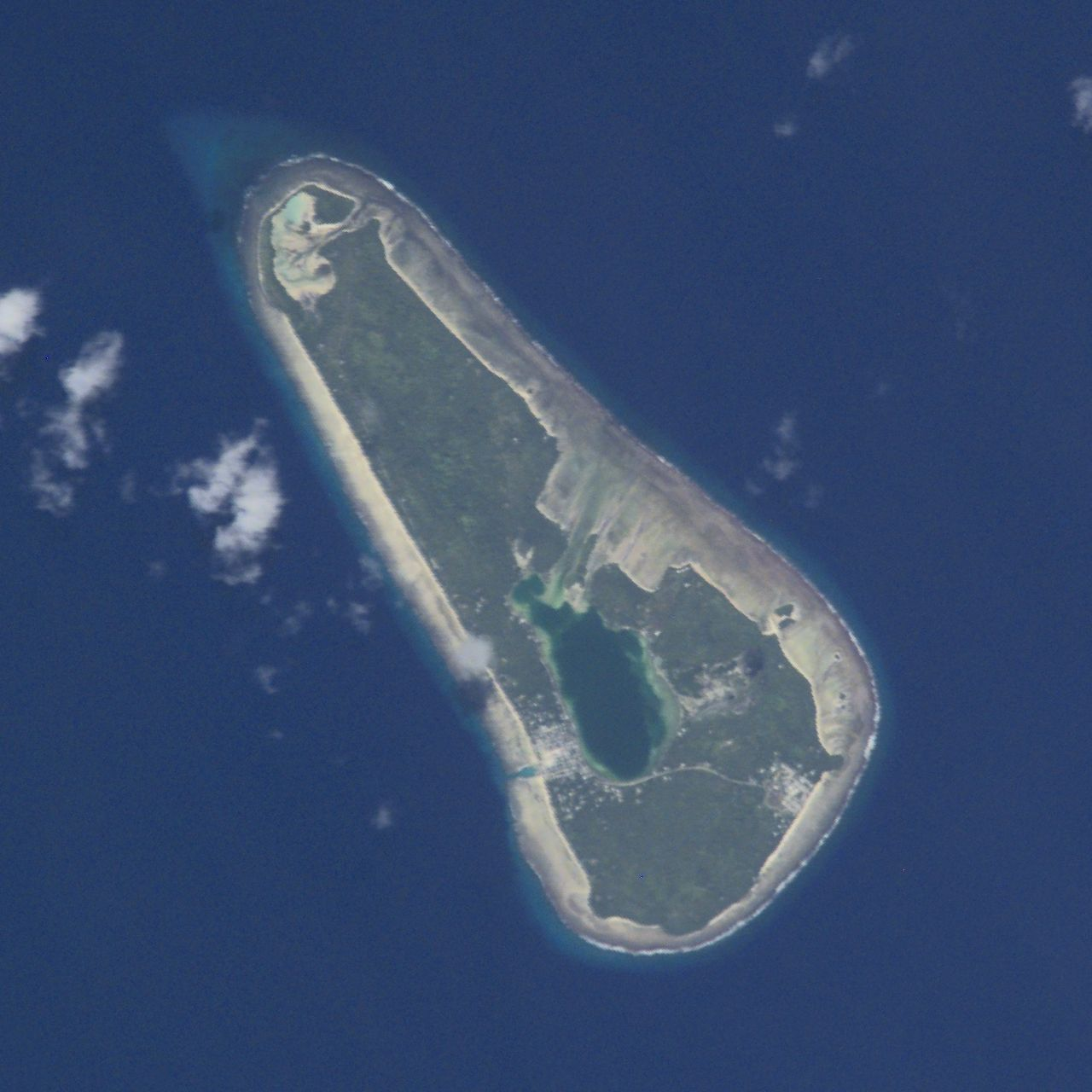
Vaitupu Island

Motufoua Secondary School is operated by the government of Tuvalu, while retaining a connection with the Church of Tuvalu through the use of the Motufoua School Church and with a chaplain as a member of the school staff. The students attend services at the Motufoua School Church.

== Fire ==
The fire on 9 March 2000 was a traumatic event at the school and for Tuvalu. It raised questions about fire safety equipment and training and security practices in the dormitories. A memorial service was held the following year in memory of the eighteen school girls and their matron who tragically lost their lives. Tuvaluan leaders as well as parents of the victims attended the memorial service. The Tuvalu Philatelic Bureau commemorated the event.

Opetaia Foa’i from the band Te Vaka wrote the song "Loimata E Maligi" (lit. Let The Tears Fall Down) in memory of the 19 girls who died when a fire broke out in the school in March 2000. In 2016, the song was rewritten as "An Innocent Warrior" for the Walt Disney Pictures animated film Moana.

== Academics ==
The school offers the following subjects: English, Mathematics, Chemistry, Physics, Biology, Agriculture Science, History, Geography, Accounting, Economics, Design Technology, Woodwork, Home Economics, Computer Science, and Commercial Studies.

The pupil-teacher ratio for secondary education is 25:1 (2001/02). Motufoua offers Forms 3‐6, with the students studying for the Fiji Junior Certificate (FJC) at Year 10, Tuvaluan Certificate at Year 11, and the Pacific Senior Secondary Certificate at Year 12, which is set by the Fiji-based exam board SPBEA.

Sixth form students who pass their Pacific Secondary School Certificate (PSSC) go on to the Augmented Foundation Programme, funded by the government of Tuvalu. This program is required for tertiary education programmes outside of Tuvalu and is available at the University of the South Pacific (USP) Extension Centre in Funafuti.

In 2009 a vocational stream at Year 12 was introduced at Motufoua. The vocational stream provides training for students who do not intend to go on to tertiary education.

== Education in the 21st century ==
Motufoua Secondary School has a central role in the development of Tuvalu. The education strategy, as described in the national strategy plan for 2021-2030, is to provide for quality education for sustainable living. The issues to be addressed include preparing school leavers to cope when entering university, providing appropriate e-learning opportunities through the internet, and developing a framework for the strengthening of the Tuvaluan language.

The school staff include Tuvaluan teachers and teachers from other countries.

Motufoua has limited library facilities and the school has limited numbers of computers. In 2011 the school offered a course in computer studies for the first time. In 2012 it offered the Certificate IV in Information Technology through a franchise program from Fiji National University.

In 2012, Atufenua Maui and educators from Japan worked on the implementation of an e-learning pilot system for Motufoua Secondary School that applies the Modular Object Oriented Dynamic Learning Environment (Moodle). The e-learning system is intended to benefit students and to provide computer skills to students who will enter tertiary education outside Tuvalu.

== Environmental sustainability ==
In 2010 what was described as the largest diesel-solar photovoltaic (PV) hybrid electricity system in the South Pacific was installed at the school. This electricity system results in the school having a solar system during the day and a diesel generator at night. This hybrid system is part of government policy to increase the use of renewable energy sources. Before the installment of the system the school relied upon a diesel powered generator, which needed to be turned off at the night. The new system saves thousands of dollars in diesel costs and provides a 24-hour supply of energy, with up to 200 kWh per day.

As of 2025, there is unreliable water, which affects the students' attendance, performance and overall well-being. Tuvalu's Education and Public Works departments are working with UNICEF, with funding from India, to build a new water tank to stabilize residents' water access.

== Development funded by Japan ==
Japan has assisted with the development of Motufoua Secondary School.

In 1996 Japanese assistance overcame problems associated with shortage of facilities including building classrooms, dormitories, special classrooms, dining hall and kitchen.

In 2011 Japan provided assistance through its Grant Aid scheme to build 12 new classrooms, dormitories for students, and a gymnasium. In addition, the buildings previously funded by Japan were renovated. The new facilities funded by Japan include a multi-purpose hall, tennis, volleyball and basketball courts, and procurement of library, medical, administration, kitchen, and computer equipment.

== See also ==
- Fetuvalu Secondary School - Private high school on Funafuti
