= Fenua Tapu =

Island in Nui atoll, Tuvalu

Coordinates: 7°14′45″S 177°8′50″E

Fenua Tapu is an islet of Nui atoll in the Pacific Ocean state of Tuvalu.

It is the most southern and most eastern islet of Nui and is the largest (area 1.38 km^{2}). Most Nuians live on the western end of Fenua Tapu, where a village including the settlements of Alamoni - Maiaki and Manutalake - Meang (Tanrake) lies.

A Dutch expedition (the frigate Maria Reigersberg) found Nui on the morning of June 14, 1825 and named Fenua Tapu as Nederlandsch Eiland.

A New Island in the Pacific.— In July last, the Pollux, Dutch sloop of war, Captain Eeg, discovered a new and well-peopled island in the Pacific, to which the name of Nederlandich Island was given : its latitude and longitude laid down at 7° 10' S., and 177° 33' 16" E. from Greenwich. The natives were athletic and fierce, great thieves, and, from their shewing no symptoms of fear when muskets were discharged, evidently unacquainted with the effects of fire-arms.

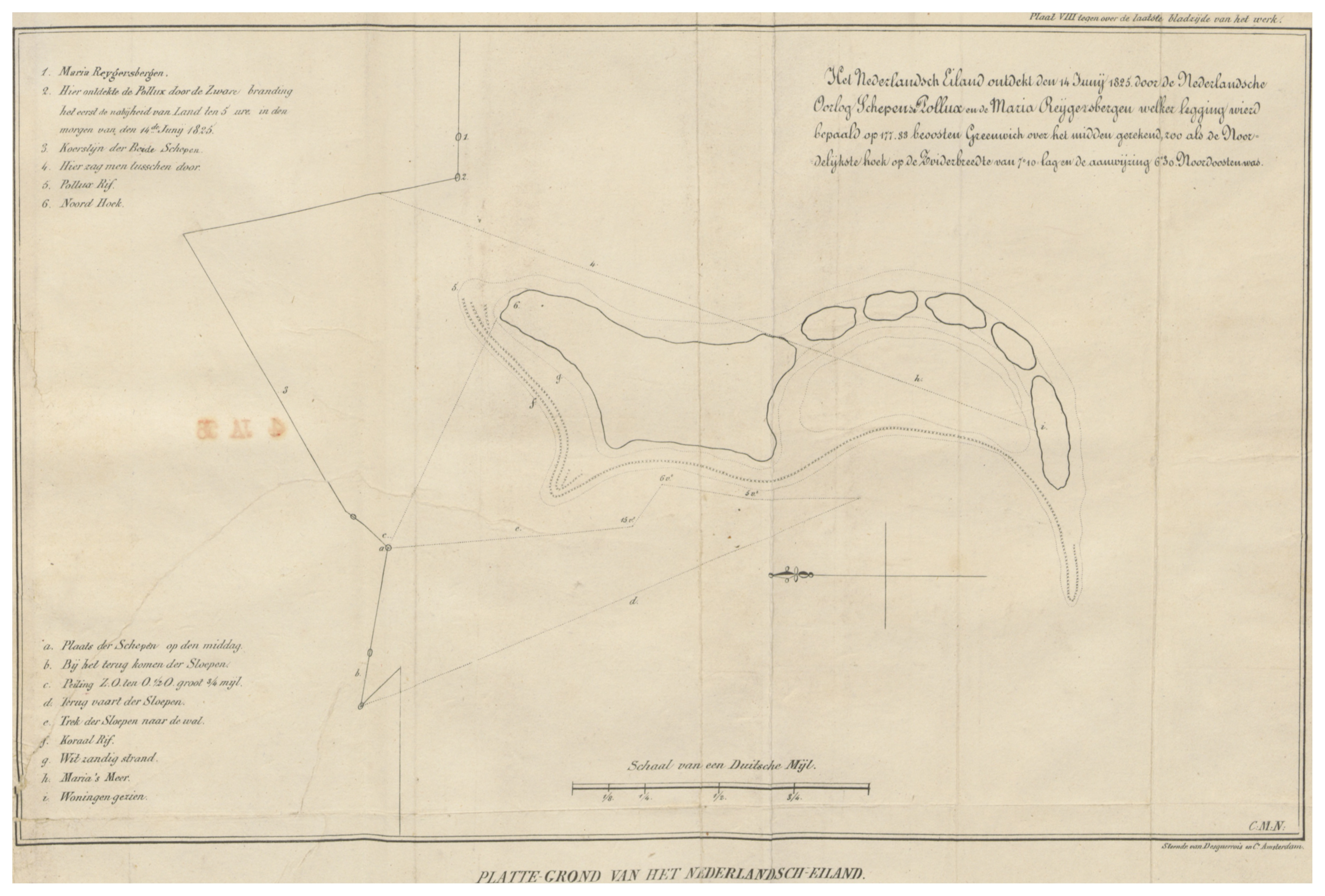
Dutch map of the island, made in June 1825

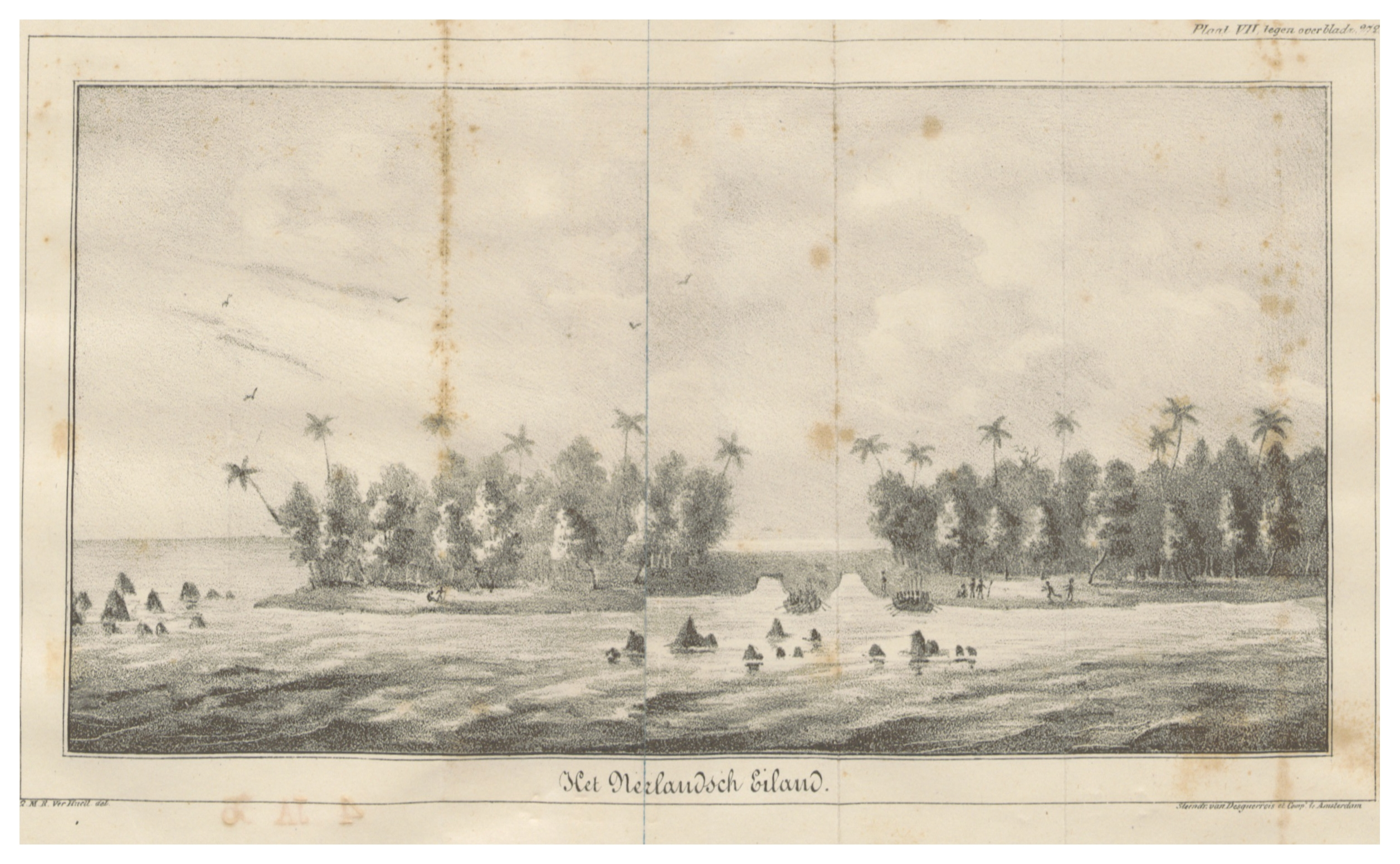
View of the main island

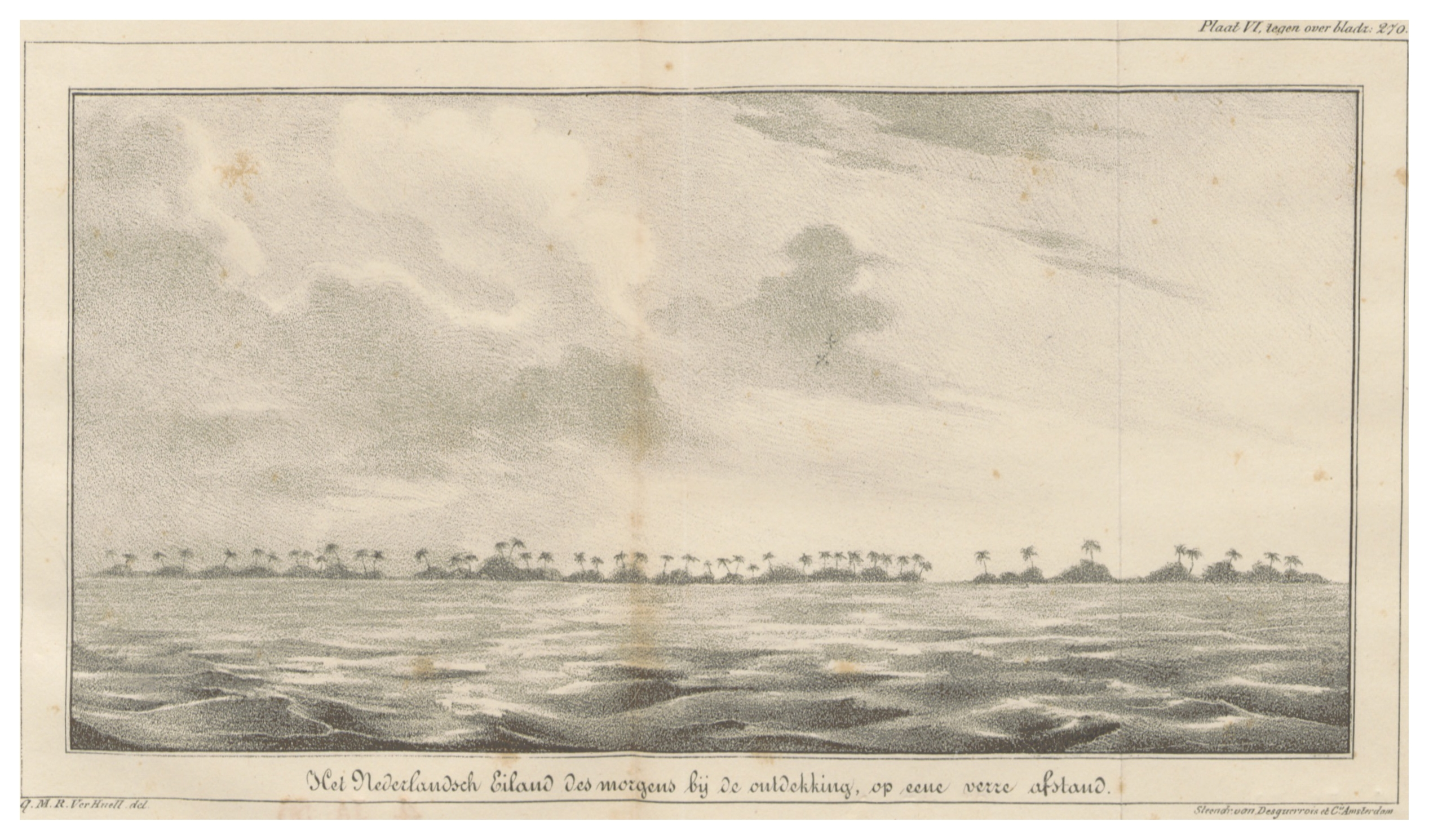
View of the atoll
