= Apalolo - Saniuta =

- Village
- Location in Tuvalu
- Coordinates: 7.4922°S 178.6821°E
- Country: Tuvalu
- Island: Vaitupu

Population
  - Total: 225

Apalolo - Saniuta is a village located on the island of Vaitupu in Tuvalu. It has a population of 225.
