= Tumaseu =

Village on the island of Vaitupu, Tuvalu

Coordinates: 7°29′14.07″S 178°40′44.01″E

Tumaseu is a village located on the island of Vaitupu, Tuvalu. According to the 2012 census, there were 248 inhabitants. The area of the village was 0.04 km^{2}.
