= Isles of Mosana =

Pair of islands in Vaitupu atoll, Tuvalu

Coordinates: 7.4804°S 178.6939°E

The Isles of Mosana are the two small islets of Vaitupu, Tuvalu.
