= Piliaieve =

Island in Nui atoll, Tuvalu

Coordinates: 7°13′28″S 177°9′45″E

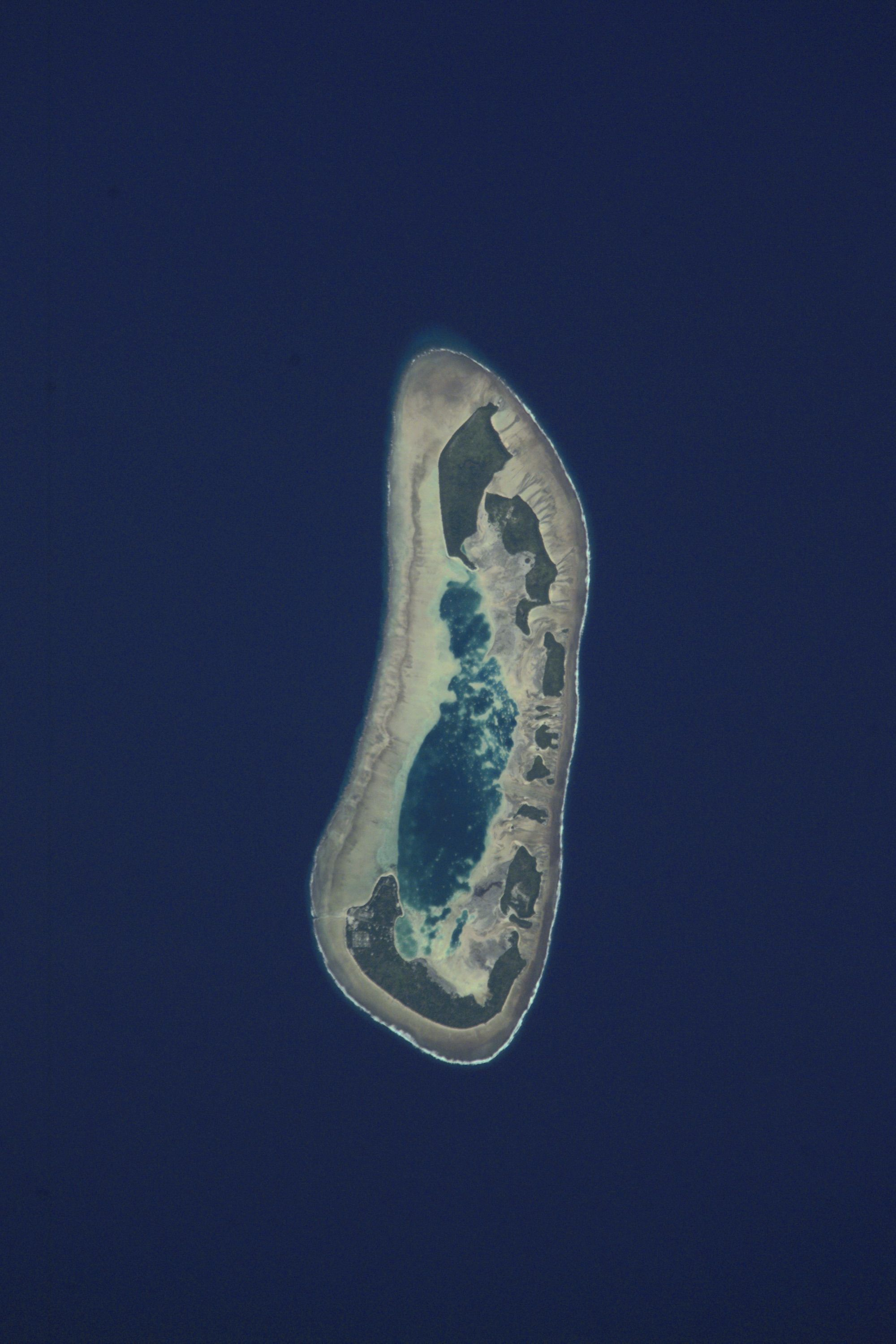
Nui atoll, Tuvalu, from space

Piliaieve is an islet in the Pacific Ocean located in the state of Nui, Tuvalu.
