= Vao, Tuvalu =

Vao
- Village
- Location in Tuvalu
- Coordinates: 5.6815°S 176.1222°E
- Country: Tuvalu
- Island: Nanumea

Population
  - Total: 37

Vao is a village on the island of Nanumea in Tuvalu. It has a population of 37.
