= Mataluafata =

- Village
- Location in Tuvalu
- Coordinates: 5.6711°S 176.1143°E
- Country: Tuvalu
- Island: Nanumea

Population
  - Total: 70

Mataluafata is a village on the island of Nanumea in Tuvalu. It has a population of 70.
