= Aulotu =

- Village
- Location in Tuvalu
- Coordinates: 8.0300°S 178.3166°E
- Country: Tuvalu
- Atoll: Nukufetau
- Island: Savave

Population
  - Total: 360

Aulotu is a village of the island of Savave in Nukufetau. Its population is 360.
