= Maneapa =

- Village
- Location in Tuvalu
- Coordinates: 8.0267°S 178.3135°E
- Country: Tuvalu
- Atoll: Nukufetau
- Island: Savave

Population
  - Total: 221

Maneapa is a village on the island of Savave, in Nukufetau atoll. It has a population of 221.
