= Asau, Tuvalu =

Village in Vaitupu, Tuvalu

Coordinates: 7°30′S 178°40′E

Location of Asau in Tuvalu

Asau is a village in Tuvalu. It is the second largest village in Tuvalu and has a population of 650 (2009). Asau is on the island of Vaitupu.
