= Pepesala =

- Village
- Location in Tuvalu
- Coordinates: 9.3712°S 179.8089°E
- Country: Tuvalu
- Island: Nukulaelae

Population
  - Total: 239

Pepesala is a village on the island of Nukulaelae in Tuvalu. It has a population of 239.
