= Luasamotu =

Islet in Vaitupu atoll, Tuvalu

Coordinates: 7.485°S 178.6971°E

Luasamotu is an uninhabited islet of Vaitupu, Tuvalu. Luasamotu on the reef off the eastern part of Vaitupu known as Matangi.

== See also ==
- Desert island
- List of islands
