= Tanrake =

- Village
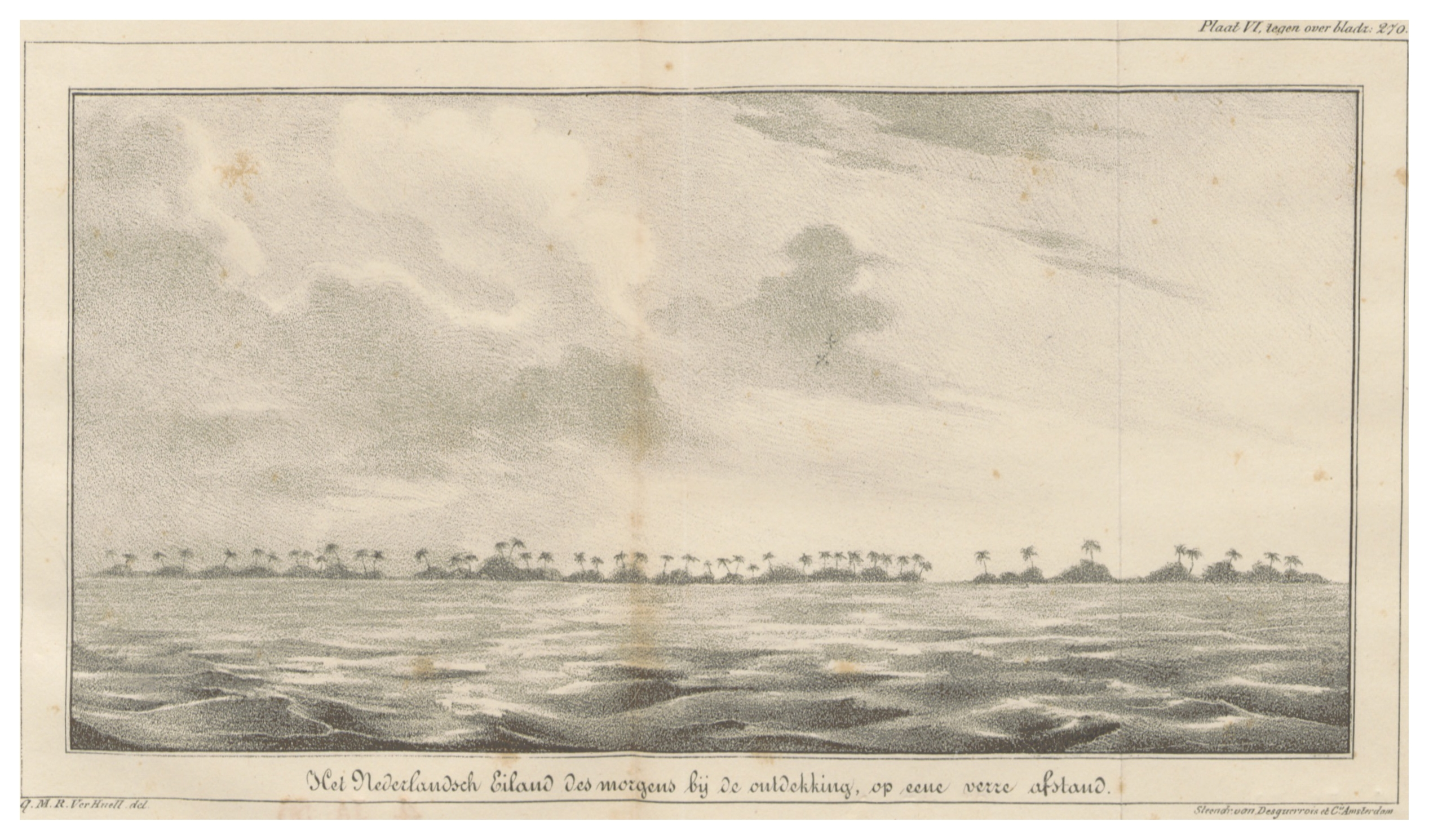
- The Tanrake island is a populated place in the Pacific Ocean. The location is 7.25°S 177.15°E. The Dutch expedition found the Tanrake Islands at the morning of June 14th, 1825 at the position 7°9'S 177°28'E (Logbook of the Fregate MARIA REIGERSBERG) and named the main island Nederlandsch Eiland.

- Location within Tuvalu
- Coordinates: 7.24583°S 177.147°E
- Country: Tuvalu

Population (2012)
  - Total: 221

Tanrake is a village in Tuvalu. It is on Nui atoll, on Fenua Tapu islet. The location is 7.25°S 177.15°E.

Tanrake is also known as Manutalake – Meang. In the 2012 Census the population was 221 people.
