= Matagi, Vaitupu =

Motufoua
- Village
- Location in Tuvalu
- Coordinates: 7.4816°S 178.6856°E
- Country: Tuvalu
- Island: Vaitupu

Population
  - Total: 40

Matagi is a village on the island of Vaitupu in Tuvalu. Its population is 40.
