= Teava =

- Village
- Location in Tuvalu
- Coordinates: 6.1082°S 177.33424°E
- Country: Tuvalu
- Island: Niutao

Population
  - Total: 219

Teava is a village on the island of Niutao in Tuvalu. Its population is 219.
