= Haumaefa =

- Village
- Location in Tuvalu
- Coordinates: 5.6752°S 176.1167°E
- Country: Tuvalu
- Island: Nanumea

Population
  - Total: 174

Haumaefa is a village on the island of Nanumea in Tuvalu. It has a population of 174.
