= Temotu, Tuvalu =

Island in Vaitupu atoll, Tuvalu

Temoutu
- Interactive map of Temoutu

Geography
- Location: South Pacific
- Coordinates: 7°27′S 178°40′E
- Total islands: 1

Administration
- Tuvalu

Demographics
- Population: 52

Map

Temotu is an islet of Vaitupu in Tuvalu. Temotu village which has a current population of 52 inhabitants resides on the islet. The average elevation of Temotu Village is 1 meter above sea level.
