= Alapi =

Village on the atoll of Funafuti, Tuvalu

Coordinates: 8°31′19″S 179°11′44″E

Alapi is a village on the atoll of Funafuti, Tuvalu. According to 2012 census, there were 1029 inhabitants. The area of the village is 0.11 km^{2}.
