= Hauma, Tuvalu =

Hauma
- Village
- Location in Tuvalu
- Coordinates: 5.6701°S 176.1118°E
- Country: Tuvalu
- Island: Nanumea

Population
  - Total: 78

Hauma is a village on the island of Nanumea in Tuvalu. It has a population of 78.
