= Matagi, Nanumea =

Matagi
- Village
- Location in Tuvalu
- Coordinates: 5.6685°S 176.1219°E
- Country: Tuvalu
- Island: Nanumea

Population
  - Total: 22

Matagi is a village on the island of Nanumea in Tuvalu. It has a population of 22.
