= Lolua =

- Village
- Location in Tuvalu
- Coordinates: 05°40′25″S 176°06′54″E
- Country: Tuvalu
- Atoll: Nanumea

Population (2010)
  - Total: 215

Lolua is the administrative headquarters and capital of the Nanumea Atoll in the Pacific island country of Tuvalu. The village has 215 inhabitants (as of 2010) and is located about 465 kilometers northwest of the capital Funafuti. Lolua is located in the northwest of the main island Nanumea.
