= Vaitupu =

Atoll and one of nine districts of Tuvalu

- Atoll
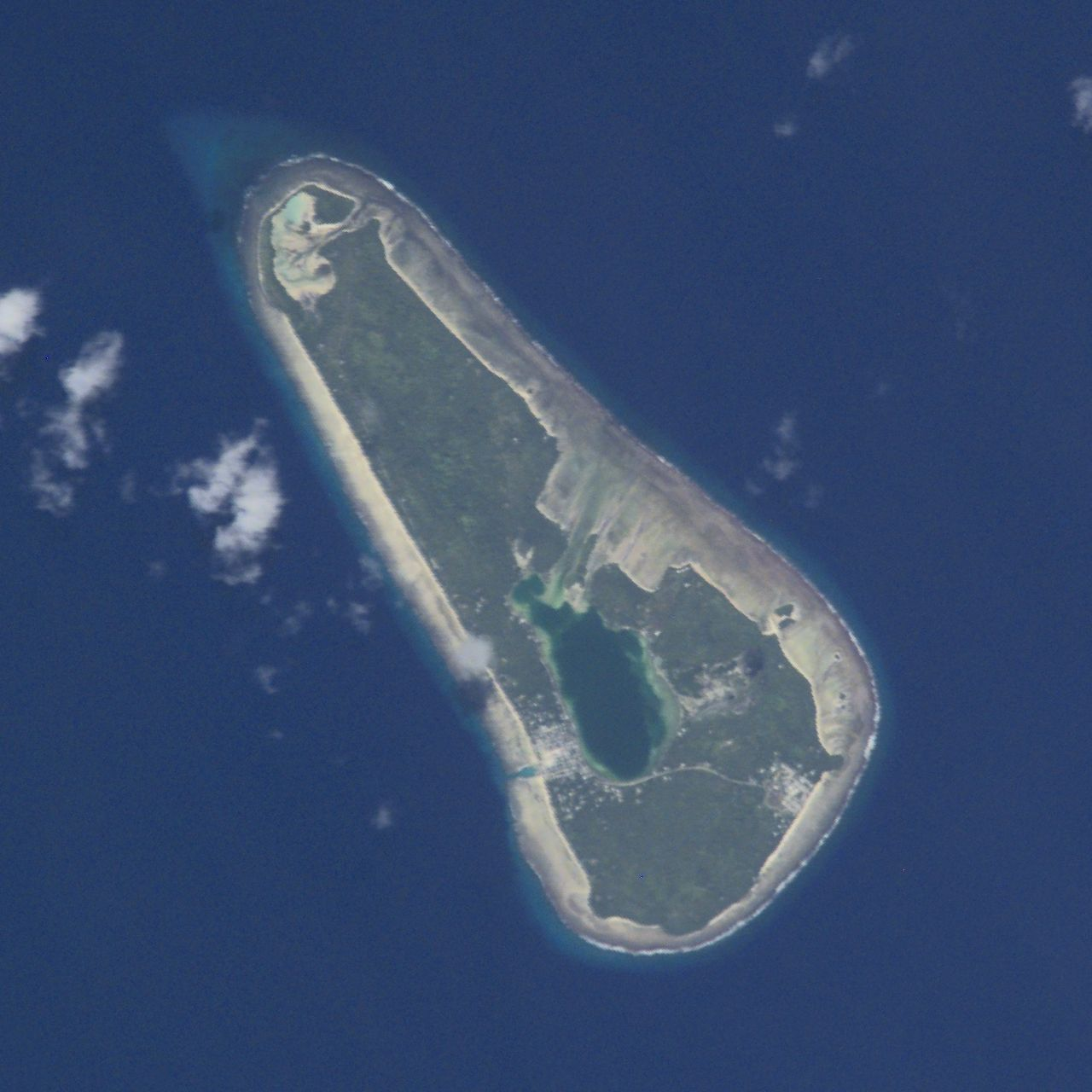
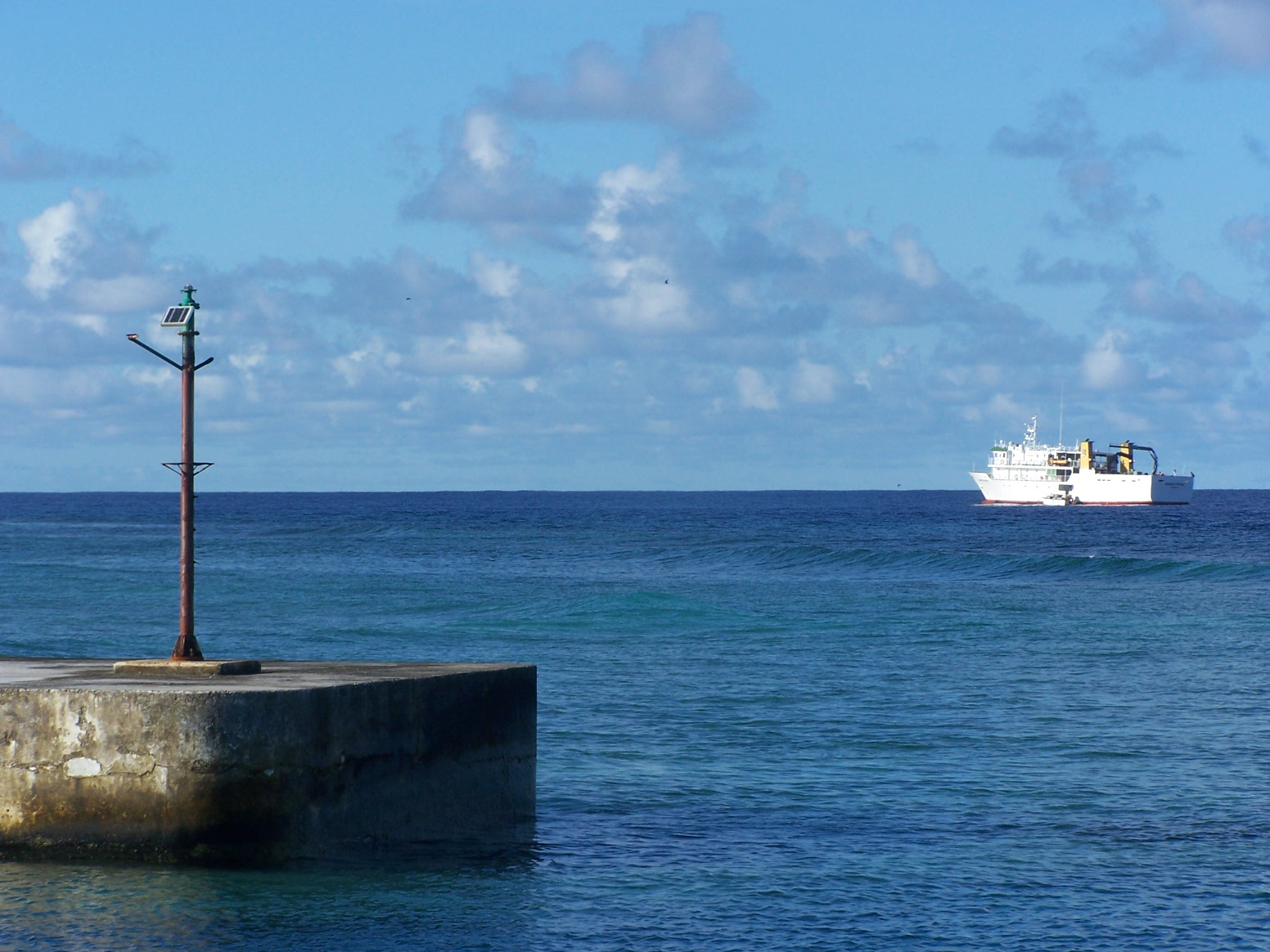
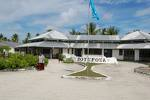
- Satellite image of Vaitupu Vaitipu Harbour Motufoua Secondary School

- Flag

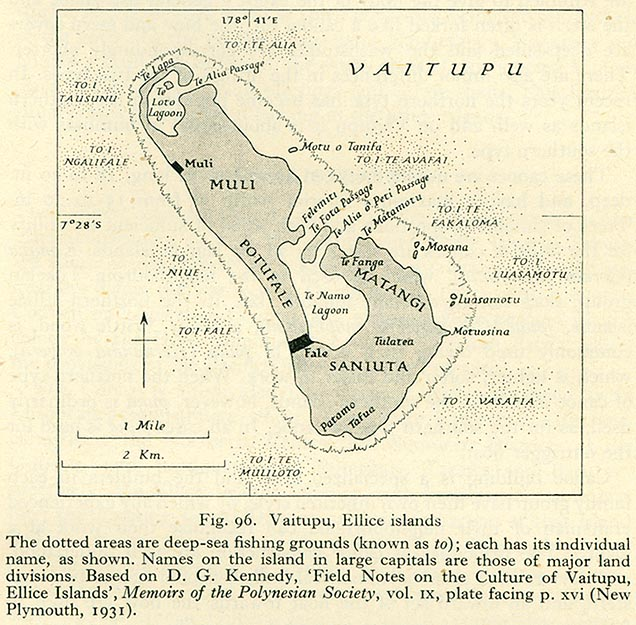
- Map of Vaitupu, 1931

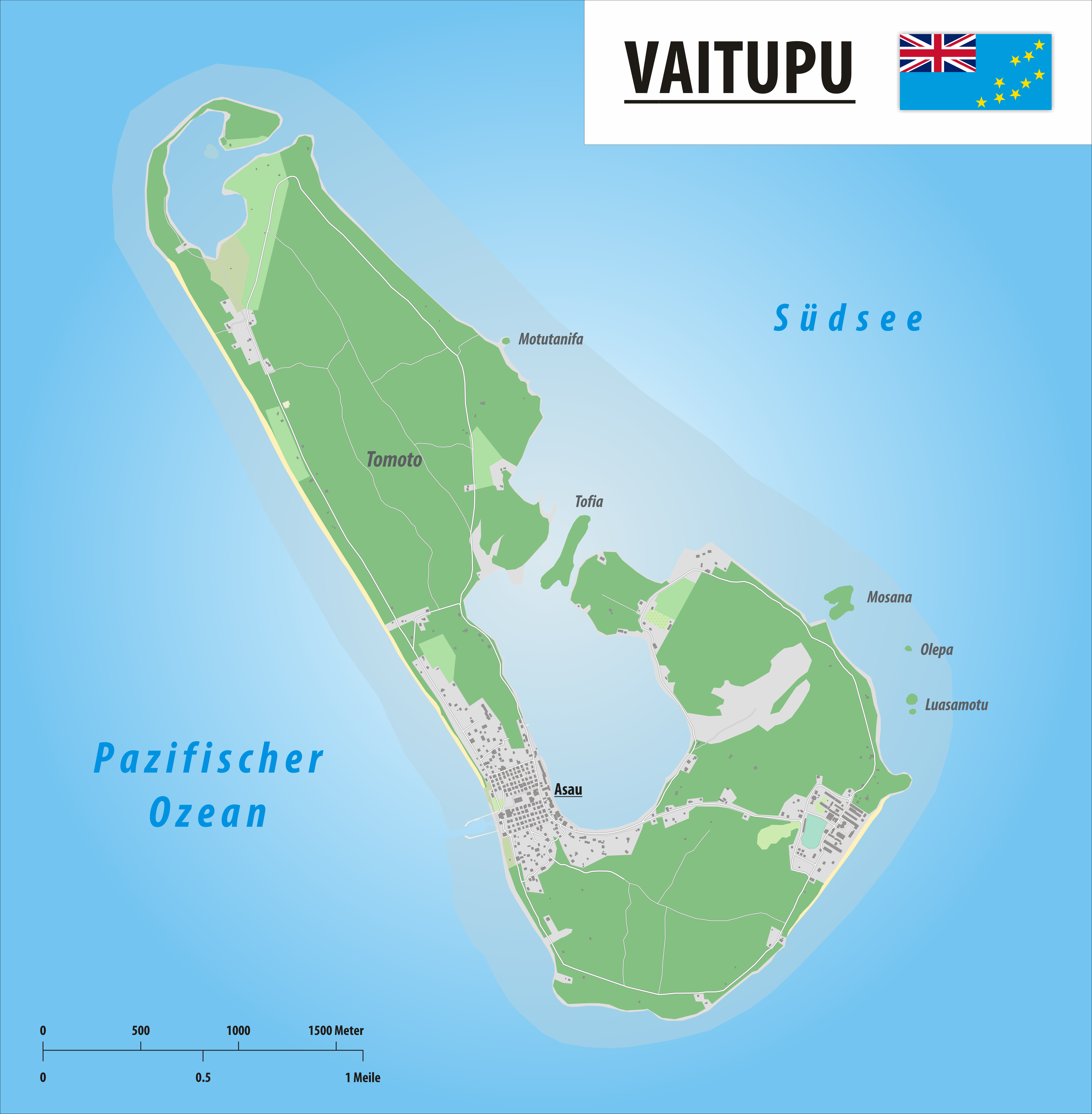
- Map of the atoll

- Location in Tuvalu
- Coordinates: 07°28′S 178°41′E
- Country: Tuvalu

Area
  - Total: 5.60 km^{2} (2.16 sq mi)

Population (2022)
  - Total: 1,007
  - Density: 180/km^{2} (466/sq mi)
- ISO 3166 code: TV-VAI

Vaitupu is the largest atoll of the nation of Tuvalu. It is located at 7.48 degrees south and 178.83 degrees east. There are 1,077 people (2022 Census) living on 5.6 square kilometres (2.2 square miles) with the main village being Asau.

== History ==
=== Discovery and settlement ===
The exact date of Vaitupu's first settlement is unknown. According to oral history, the founder of the Vaitupuan community was a Samoan by the name of Telematua, who arrived in the 16th or 17th century. However, it is possible that Tongans may have first reached the atoll during the mid-13th century. Vaitupu has maintained contacts with Tonga throughout its history, both peaceful (alliances through marriage) and hostile (visits by Tongan slave-seekers). Vaitupu was also visited by I-Kiribati, and was thus far from isolated. Vaitupu means 'the fountain of water'.

Obed Starbuck—captain of the whaler Loper from Nantucket, Massachusetts—sighted the island on 26 April 1826, naming it 'Tracy Island'. William Plaskett, captain of the Nantucket whaler Independence II, called at Vaitupu on 21 August 1827. Given Starbuck's earlier sighting of the island, the log entry by Plaskett for the day that he rediscovered it suggests the locals hadn't seen another ship before then:

[...] At daylight found it to be a small low island about 6 miles long. [...] Having one native and an interpreter on board who we brought from Rotumah, who formerly belonged to one of the islands about here and who understood their language we learned that they had never seen a ship before. The natives name of this island is voytopu. It is not laid down on the books or charts so we call it a new discovery. Lat.7°-25 [south] Longitude 178°-78 East.

=== 19th century ===
The United States Exploring Expedition under Charles Wilkes visited Vaitupu in 1841.

Samoan pastors from the London Missionary Society successfully introduced Christianity to the island in the 1860s. The pastors implemented religious regulations, outlawing many cultural practices. They also introduced the Samoan language, as their Bibles were written in Samoan. Vaitupuans became literate in Samoan rather than in their own language. Henry (Harry) Nitz, the resident trader, helped in the construction of the first church.

Vaitupuans celebrate Te Aso Fiafia (Happy Day) on 25 November of each year. Te Aso Fiafia commemorates 25 November 1887 which was the date on which the final instalment of a debt of $13,000 was repaid to H. M. Ruge and Company, a German trading firm that operated from Apia, Samoa. Vaitupu history is that Thomas William Williams, the Ruge agent, pretended to do his customers a favour by allowing them to obtain goods on credit. In 1883 the debt of the Vaitupuans was $13,000 and H. M. Ruge and Company had threatened to seize the entire island unless the debt was repaid. Neemia, a Vaitupuan pastor living in Samoa, returned and organised working parties to collect coconuts and prepare copra to sell to pay off the debt, with Henry Nitz, the Webber & Co agent on Vaitupu, contributing money to meet the final payment. The Vaitupuans, with the help of their friends from Funafuti, repaid the debt by the due date. Seven thousand dollars was repaid by 1886 and the balance was paid on 25 November 1887.

Vaitupuan tradition is that chance favoured their efforts, a ship sent to collect the last payment sank, as did the second ship the trading schooner Vaitupulemele. By the time a third ship arrived most of the money had been collected. However, the trading schooner Vaitupulemele appears to have a different role in the history of Vaitupu. The creation of the debt that was repaid to Ruge & Co extended beyond the purchase of goods on credit to include the purchase price of the Vaitupulemele by the Vaitupu Company. While T.M. Williams had been the Ruge agent, he later formed the Vaitupu Company with the Vaitupuan community and purchased the Vaitupulemele from Ruge & Co. However the schooner was lost during a voyage from Samoa and soon after Williams died, leaving no accounting for copra that had been shipped from Vaitupu. In any event the Vaitupuans paid the full amount claimed by Ruge & Co, although that company soon after went into liquidation.

=== 20th century ===
Vaitupu Post Office opened around 1916.

Donald Gilbert Kennedy, the resident District Officer in the administration of the Gilbert and Ellice Islands Colony from 1932 to 1938, describe the construction of paopao and of the variations of single-outrigger canoes that had been developed on Vaitupu and Nanumea.

Neli Lifuka was the magistrate on Vaitupu from 1945 to 1951. He was instrumental in collecting the funds to purchase Kioa Island in Fiji. Initially 37 people migrated from Vaitupu to live on Kioa Island; within a decade, more than 235 people followed.

On 30 January and 1 February 1990, Cyclone Ofa had a major impact on Vaitupu, with around 85 percent of residential homes, trees and food crops being destroyed.

=== 21st century ===
Vaitupu received worldwide attention in 2000, when a fire in a dormitory at the Motufoua school killed 18 girls and a female adult supervisor. It was later discovered that the fire was caused by a student using a candle to read during the night. The Prime Minister Ionatana Ionatana declared a national tragedy and quickly travelled to the island to witness the aftermath. A memorial service was held the following year in memory of the 18 girls and their matron who died. Tuvaluan leaders as well as parents of the victims attended the memorial service.

In the 2011 Tuvalu drought, Vaitupu experienced the loss of coconut palm trees, pulaka and taro due to the high temperatures and arid soil.

In March 2015, storm surges resulting from Cyclone Pam caused damage to houses, crops and infrastructure.

== Geography ==
The island, which covers approximately 5.6 square kilometres (2 sq mi), includes swamps, mangroves, a fringing coral reef, and a large lagoon.

Vaitupu atoll consists of at least nine isles:

- Luasamotu
- Mosana (group of 2)
- Motutanifa
- Temotu
- Te Motu Olepa
- Tofia
- Vaitupu proper
- and at least one other islet

The biggest island is Vaitupu proper, followed by Tofia.

The only village on Vaitupu consists of the neighbourhoods Tumaseu and Asau. There is a church, Tolise Primary School, at least one guesthouse and a post office. An aquaculture project has been established in the lagoon.

== Renewable energy ==
In 2010 what was then described as the largest diesel-solar photovoltaic (PV) hybrid electricity system in the South Pacific was installed at Motufoua Secondary School. Prior to the instalment of the system the school relied upon a diesel powered generator, which needed to be turned off during the night. The hybrid system saves thousands of dollars in diesel costs and provides the school with a 24-hour supply of energy, with up to 200 kWh per day.

In 2014 New Zealand and the European Union agreed to provide finance to the Government of Tuvalu to install battery-backed solar photovoltaic (PV) systems for the outer islands. From January to March 2015 Powersmart, a New Zealand company, implemented German solar power technology to build the new Vaitupu powerhouse.

== Transportation and tourism ==
There is a wharf on Vaitupu but no harbour, meaning passengers must board a smaller boat from the inter-island passenger/cargo ships to get to the Vaitupu. There are paths and small unpaved roads throughout the island. Only a few cars drive on Vaitupu. In the main village there is a guest house called Vivalia III located at the wharf near the main church.

== Culture ==
The community activities on Vaitupu include the Nafa Moa and Talo (Taro crops and chickens competition). In this contest the community is divided into two rival teams. Members of each team compete for who can grow the heavier taro or larger chickens; the climax comes with the weigh-off between the competitors, concluding a day of good-natured rivalry and fun.

== Demographics ==
The population of Vaitupu from 1860 to 1900 is estimated to be 400 people. Vaitupu is home to the second-largest population in Tuvalu, numbering 1,576 (2002 Census) and 1,555 (2012 census). Despite its relatively large size, Vaitupu became so overcrowded during the 1940s that a number of families migrated to Fiji to live on Kioa Island.

In the 2012 census, the population of the villages of Vaitupu were:

- Apalolo - Saniuta: 263
- Tumaseu: 248
- Potufale: 230
- Asau: 198

== Politics ==
Paulson Panapa and Maina Talia were elected in the 2024 general election.

Vaitupu constituency results
Party	Candidate	Votes	%
Nonpartisan	Paulson Panapa	585	32.46
Nonpartisan	Maina Talia	448	24.86
Nonpartisan	Nielu Meisake	420	23.30
Nonpartisan	Isaia Taape	349	19.36

== Education ==
The primary school on Vaitupu is called Tolise, which was established in 1953. A secondary school called Elisefou (New Ellice), opened in 1923 and closed in 1953 when the boys were transferred to King George V School located in Bikenibeu, South Tarawa. The first headmaster of Elisefou was Donald Gilbert Kennedy, who was a strict disciplinarian who would not hesitate to beat his students. The two most famous Tuvaluans from the school were Tuvalu's first Governor General, Sir Fiatau Penitala Teo and its first Prime Minister, Toaripi Lauti. Kennedy published Field Notes on the Culture of Vaitupu, Ellice Islands in the Journal of the Polynesian Society in instalments between 1929 and 1932 and as a book in 1931.

Motufoua Secondary School was established in 1905 by the London Missionary Society. Over time the school has evolved and it is now a boarding school for boys and girls that is administered by the Department of Education. In 2009 the student roll at Motufoua Secondary School was 550. In the 2012 census, 502 people were recorded as being at Motufoua Secondary School.

== Notable residents ==
The Reverend Sir Filoimea Telito (19 March 1945 – 11 July 2011) as a young man was a teacher at Motufoua Secondary School. After completing theological studies, he returned to Motufoua to serve as Pastor. Later he became Principal of Motufoua. He served as the Governor-General of Tuvalu (2005–2010).

Sir Tomasi Puapua represented Vaitupu in the Parliament of Tuvalu. He was the second Prime Minister (1981–1989). Puapua later served as Governor-General of Tuvalu (1998–2003).

Apisai Ielemia (19 August 1955 – 19 November 2018) represented Vaitupu in the Parliament of Tuvalu. He served as Prime Minister of Tuvalu (2006–2010).

Taukelina Finikaso represented Vaitupu in the parliament from 2006 to 2019. He served as Minister of Communications and Works (2006–2010) and served as the Foreign Minister in the Sopoaga Ministry (2013–2019).

== See also ==
- List of villages and neighbourhoods in Tuvalu
- List of islands of Tuvalu
