= Elections and political parties in Tuvalu =

Tuvalu elects a legislature on a national level. The Parliament of Tuvalu (Palamene o Tuvalu) has 16 members, elected for a four-year term in 8 double-seat constituencies. Tuvalu is a de facto non-partisan democracy since it does not have political parties. The political system is based on personal alliances and loyalties derived from clan and family connections. It does tend to have both a distinct government and a distinct opposition. The 16 members of the current parliament are elected from eight two-seat constituencies via plurality block voting.

Throughout the history of the parliament three women have been elected: Naama Maheu Latasi, from 1989 to 1997; Pelenike Isaia, from 2011 to 2015; and Dr Puakena Boreham from 2015 to 2024.

== Parliament of Tuvalu (Palamene o Tuvalu) ==
During the time Tuvalu was a British dependency the parliament was called the House of the Assembly. Following independence in October 1978 the House of the Assembly was renamed the Parliament of Tuvalu (Palamene o Tuvalu).

The Constitution of Tuvalu states that it "is the supreme law of Tuvalu" and that "all other laws shall be interpreted and applied subject to this Constitution"; it sets out the Principles of the Bill of Rights and the Protection of the Fundamental Rights and Freedoms. In 1986 the Constitution adopted upon independence was amended in order to give attention to Tuvaluan custom and tradition as well as the aspirations and values of the Tuvaluan people. The changes placed greater emphasis on Tuvaluan community values rather than Western concepts of individual entitlement.

At the date of independence there were 12 members of the Parliament of Tuvalu. Amendments to the Electoral Provisions (Parliament) Act in 1999 & 2000 increased the membership of parliament to 15 MPs. The Electoral Provisions (Parliament) Amendment Act 2019 increased the number of elected representatives for the electorate of Nukulaelae to become 2 PMs. So that each of the 8 island electorates is represented by 2 MPs. The smallest island, Niulakita, is represented in the parliament by the members of the constituency of Niutao.

A candidate for parliament must be a citizen of Tuvalu of a minimum age of 21 years. Voting in Tuvalu is not compulsory. At 18 years of age, Tuvaluans are eligible to be added to the electoral rolls.

In August 2007 the Constitution was changed to increase the number of ministers from 5 to 7. Those members selected the prime minister and the Speaker of the parliament by secret ballot. The Ministers that form the Cabinet are appointed by the governor-general on the advice of the prime minister. The Attorney-General sits in parliament, but does not vote, as the parliamentary role of the Attorney-General is purely advisory.

== Parties ==
Due to the small population size and scale of the 16 seat parliament, Tuvalu has no political parties, meaning that the political system in Tuvalu exhibits the traits of a Non-partisan democracy.

== 1977 elections to the House of Assembly ==
During the time Tuvalu was a British dependency the parliament was called the House of the Assembly or Fale i Fono. Following independence in October 1978 the House of the Assembly was renamed the Parliament of Tuvalu or Palamene o Tuvalu.

As a consequence of the 1974 Ellice Islands self-determination referendum, separation occurred in two stages. The Tuvaluan Order 1975, which took effect on 1 October 1975, recognised Tuvalu as a separate British dependency with its own government. The second stage occurred on 1 January 1976 when separate administrations were created out of the civil service of the Gilbert and Ellice Islands Colony.

Elections to the House of Assembly of the British Colony of Tuvalu were held on 27 August 1977. The candidates for the position of chief minister were Toaripi Lauti from Funafuti, Henry Naisali from Nukulaelae and Dr. Tomasi Puapua from Vaitupu; however, Henry Naisali withdrew before the ballot leaving Toaripi Lauti to win by eight votes to four. Lauti was appointed as chief minister on 1 October 1977. The parliament was dissolved in July 1978 with the government of Toaripi Lauti continuing as a caretaker government, until the 1981 elections were held.

== 1981 elections to the Parliament of Tuvalu ==
The first elections after independence will not held until 8 September 1981. 26 candidates contested the 12 seats. Dr. Tomasi Puapua, was elected as prime minister with a 7:5 majority over the group a members of parliament headed by former prime minister Toaripi Lauti.

== 1985 elections to the Parliament of Tuvalu ==
The general election was held on 12 September 1985, with nine members re-elected including prime minister Tomasi Puapua and minister of finance Henry Naisali. On 21 September, Tomasi Puapua was re-elected as prime minister; he subsequently appointed a five-member Cabinet. He remained PM until the 1989 general election.

== 1989 elections to the Parliament of Tuvalu ==
The general election was held on 26 March 1989. Naama Maheu Latasi was elected to represent the constituency of Nanumea and was the first woman elected to the Parliament of Tuvalu. Puapua chose not the offer himself as a candidate for PM after the 1989 election. Bikenibeu Paeniu was subsequently elected as prime minister, with a five-member Cabinet formed on 16 October 1989. He remained PM until the 1993 general election.

== 1993 elections to the Parliament of Tuvalu ==
The general election was held on 2 September 1993. In the subsequent parliament the members were evenly split in their support of the incumbent prime minister Bikenibeu Paeniu and the former prime minister Tomasi Puapua.

As a consequence, the governor-general dissolved the parliament on 22 September and a further election took place on 25 November 1993. Tomasi Puapua chose not to offer himself as a candidate for PM. The subsequent parliament elected Kamuta Latasi as prime minister on 10 December 1993, with a 7:5 majority over the group a members of parliament headed by former prime minister Bikenibeu Paeniu. The deputy prime minister was Otinielu Tausi and Tomasi Puapua was appointed the speaker of the parliament. Kamuta Latasi was the prime minister until 17 December 1996. As the result of the vote on a motion of no confidence Kamuta Latasi resigned and Bikenibeu Paeniu was elected as prime minister for the second time on 23 December 1996. He remained as prime minister until the 1998 general elections.

== 1998 elections to the Parliament of Tuvalu ==
On 18 December 1997 the parliament was dissolved and the general election was held on 26 March 1998. During the election campaign, candidates from the incumbent government and the opposition traded allegations of sexual and financial misconduct. The result of the election was that 7 existing members were returned (including Bikenibeu Paeniu and Tomasi Puapua); 2 members of previous parliaments were elected; and 3 new members were elected. Former prime minister Kamuta Latasi lost his seat. Bikenibeu Paeniu was re-elected prime minister on 8 April 1998; the deputy prime minister was Kokea Malua and Tomu Sione was appointed as Speaker of the parliament. Bikenibeu Paeniu remained as prime minister until he resigned following the vote on a motion of no confidence (7:4) on 14 April 1999.

Ionatana Ionatana was then elected as prime minister on 27 April 1999. After the death of prime minister Ionatana on 8 December 2000, Lagitupu Tuilimu was acting prime minister from 8 December 2000 to 24 February 2001. Faimalaga Luka became the prime minister on 23 February 2001 and was sworn in the next day with a reshuffled cabinet. Luka's government lasted until December 2001, when he lost office as the consequence of a motion of no confidence. On 13 December 2001 Koloa Talake was appointed prime minister. Talake lost his seat in parliament at the 2002 general election.

== 2002 elections to the Parliament of Tuvalu ==
The general election was held on 25 July 2002. There were 5,188 registered voters with the turnout on election date being 80% of voters. 39 candidates competed for the 15 parliamentary seats (the parliament had been increased from 12 to 15 elected members in 2000). Six members of the former parliament lost their seats including prime minister Koloa Talake, 3 cabinet ministers and the Speaker, Tomu Sione. On 2 August 2002 Saufatu Sopoanga, who had been minister of finance in the previous administration, was elected prime minister; winning the vote against Amasone Kilei (8:7). Saloa Tauia was appointed the speaker, although he died in February 2003.

The Sopoanga government lost its majority in May 2003, following the results of the 2003 Nanumea by-election and the 2003 Niutao by-election. The opposition took legal action in an attempt to force Sopoanga to recall parliament. Sopoanga recalled parliament to meet in September, On 9 September Sopoanga arranged to appointed opposition MP Faimalaga Luka as governor general, depriving the opposition of its crucial one-seat majority and triggering the 2003 Nukufetau by-election. The winner of the October by-election, Elisala Pita, joined the government's benches, enabling it to survive into 2004.

The Sopoanga government was eventually brought down by an eight-to-six motion of no confidence in August 2004. Two government members, Elisala Pita and Otinielu Tausi, crossed the floor to vote against Sopoanga. On 25 August 2004 Saufatu Sopoanga resigned as prime minister and member of parliament. A by-election was held on 7 October 2004 and Saufatu Sopoanga regained his seat. Maatia Toafa was elected prime minister on 11 October 2004 with a vote of 8:7; and Saufatu Sopoanga became deputy prime minister and minister for works, transport and communication. Maatia Toafa remained PM until the 2006 general election.

== 2006 elections to the Parliament of Tuvalu ==
The general election was held on 3 August 2006. There were 5,765 eligible voters on the electoral roll. 32 candidates, including 2 women, competed for the 15 seats. Maatia Toafa was re-elected to his seat in parliament; however all his cabinet members were defeated. Eight new members were elected to the parliament. On 14 August 2006 Apisai Ielemia was elected as prime minister; and Kamuta Latasi was appointed the speaker of the parliament. Apisai Ielemia remained PM until the 2010 general election.

== 2010 elections to the Parliament of Tuvalu ==
Parliament was dissolved on 13 August 2010, and registration began on 28 August 2010. Twenty-six candidates, including all sitting members of parliament, stood for the fifteen seats in Parliament.

There were 6,008 registered voters. Many candidates focused on climate change issues including Enele Sopoaga, a former Tuvaluan ambassador to the United Nations and Tuvalu's representative at the UN Climate Change Conference held in Copenhagen in 2009.

Ten of the 15 members of parliament retained their seats including the speaker Kamuta Latasi, while the deputy prime minister Tavau Teii lost his seat.

No women were elected in the general elections held in September 2010. In the by-election held in August 2011, Pelenike Isaia, the widow of Isaia Italeli who died the previous month, was elected by the constituency of Nui. Pelenike Isaia becoming the second woman to enter the parliament.

=== Toafa ministry ===
Following the election Maatia Toafa was elected as prime minister with the support of five new members of parliament and three members that had supported prime minister Apisai Ielemia. Maatia Toafa as supported by an (8:7) majority in the parliament. Isaia Taeia Italeli, the younger brother of the governor-general Iakoba Italeli, was appointed the Speaker of the parliament.

On 15 December 2010, prime minister Maatia Toafa's government was ousted in a vote of no confidence, which followed Willie Telavi withdrawing his support for the government. On 25 December 2010 Willy Telavi was elected prime minister with an (8:7) majority over Enele Sopoaga. Kamuta Latasi, was appointed Speaker.

Lotoala Metia, the minister of finance, died on 21 December 2012. The calling of a by-election was delayed until the High Court of Tuvalu ordered the prime minister to issue a notice to hold the by-election. The 2013 Nukufetau by-election was held on 28 June. The Nukufetau by-election was won by the opposition candidate Elisala Pita. A constitutional crisis developed when prime minister Telavi responded that, under the Constitution of Tuvalu, he was only required to convene parliament once a year, and was thus under no obligation to summon it until December 2013. Tuvalu's opposition then requested the governor-general Iakoba Italeli to intervene against the prime minister's decision. On 3 July, Italeli exercised his reserve powers in ordering parliament to convene, against the prime minister's wishes, on 30 July.

When the parliament met on 30 July, the speaker (Kamuta Latasi) refused to allow a debate on a no-confidence motion in the government of Willy Telavi. Taom Tanukale, the health minister, resigned from the parliament (and thus also from the government). This resignation appeared to be political manoeuvre as Willy Telavi responded by insisting that parliament should be suspended until a by-election was held and declined to call the by-election. In Tuvalu a by-election can only be called when requested by the prime Mmnister.

The governor-general Iakoba Italeli then proceeded to exercise his reserve powers to order Mr Telavi's removal and the appointment of Enele Sopoaga as interim prime minister. The governor-general also ordered that parliament sit on Friday 2 August to allow a vote of no-confidence in Mr Telavi and his government. Telavi then proceeding to write to Queen Elizabeth II (as the head of state of Tuvalu) informing her that he was dismissing Mr Italeli from his position as governor-general.

=== Sopoaga ministry ===
On Sunday 4 August the parliament elected Enele Sopoaga as prime minister. Vete Sakaio was subsequently appointed deputy prime minister and minister for public utilities, Maatia Toafa was appointed the minister of finance and economic development and Taukelina Finikaso was appointed the foreign minister.

As a consequence of the resignation of Taom Tanukale, the Nui by-election was held on 10 September 2013. Leneuoti Maatusi was declared the winner, polling 297 of the 778 registered voters. Maatusi has been a civil servant and served as the secretary of the Nui Falekaupule. He beat Palemene Anelu, a recent graduate of the University of the South Pacific, who received 206 votes and Taom Tanukale, the sitting member, whose resignation from parliament caused the by-election, who received 160 votes. The government of Enele Sopoaga had a majority of two going into the by-election. After the by-election Leneuoti Maatusi committed to support prime minister Enele Sopoaga.

In December 2013 a vacancy for the constituency of Nanumaga was declared by the governor-general in accordance with Section 99 (2) of the Tuvalu Constitution following an assessment of Falesa Pitoi's health. The 2014 Nanumaga by-election occurred on 14 January. The candidates were Halo Tuavai, Otinielu Tauteleimalae Tausi and Pai Teatu. Otinielu Tausi was the successful candidate. Tausi has chosen to support prime minister Enele Sopoaga, which give the government a two-thirds majority of the members of parliament. On 3 March 2014 Tausi was elected as the speaker of the parliament.

The 2014 Nanumea by-election was called following the resignation of Willy Telavi in August. The voting occurred on 19 September 2014. Mr Satini Tulaga Manuella was the successful candidate. The former University of the South Pacific senior accountant and president of the Tuvalu National Private Sector Organization (TNPSO) supported the government of Enele Sopoaga. In 2015 the parliament was dissolved with a general election set down for March 2015.

== 2015 elections to the Parliament of Tuvalu ==
The general election was held in Tuvalu on 31 March 2015. The state of emergency created by Cyclone Pam resulted in the election being delayed twice. The election was originally scheduled for 19 March, then after Cyclone Pam caused damage to the islands, the election was rescheduled for 26 March.

In the Nukufetau electorate, Enele Sopoaga and Elisala Pita were not opposed by other candidates. Namoliki Sualiki was not opposed in the Nukulaelae electorate. The other islands had contested ballots. The candidates in the constituencies of Niutao and Nui included former members of parliament. On Nui Pelenike Isaia and Leneuoti Matusi were not returned to parliament. The new members elected to represent Nui were Mackenzie Kiritome and Dr Puakena Boreham, who is the third woman to be elected as an MP.

On Niutao Vete Sakaio, the deputy-prime minister, was not elected and was succeeded by Samuelu Teo, who is a former MP. The election was a good result for the government of Enele Sopoaga. Enele Sopoaga was sworn in as prime minister and appointed the ministers to the cabinet on 10 April.

Apisai Ielemia was elected to represent Vaitupu at the general election. On 5 October 2016 Chief Justice Sweeney of the High Court of Tuvalu declared that Ielemia's parliamentary seat was vacant as he was not qualified to be a member of parliament, as the consequence of the short time the opposition MP served time in jail following his conviction on 6 May 2016 in the Magistrate's Court of charges of abuse of office during the final year of his term as Prime Minister (August 2006 to September 2010). The by-election was won by pro-government candidate Isaia Vaipuna Taape. Taape was sworn in as a member of parliament for Vaitupu on Wednesday 16 August 2017.

Sir Kamuta Latasi resigned as MP on 17 October 2018. A by-election was held on 20 November 2018, with Simon Kofe, a former senior magistrate, being elected.

== 2019 elections to the Parliament of Tuvalu ==
The 2019 general election was held on 9 September 2019. In the Nukufetau electorate the caretaker prime minister, Enele Sopoaga, was returned to Parliament, however Satini Manuella, Taukelina Finikaso and Maatia Toafa, who were ministers, were not returned. Seven new members of Parliament were elected.

=== Natano Ministry ===
On 19 September, in a secret ballot, the members of parliament elected Kausea Natano from Funafuti as prime minister with a 10-6 majority. Samuelu Teo was elected as Speaker of the Parliament of Tuvalu.

Following the death of Minute Alapati Taupo on 23 May 2022, Reverend Dr Kitiona Tausi was elected to represent Nanumaga in the by-election held on 15 July 2022. He was appointed Deputy Prime Minister & Minister for Fisheries and Trade to succeed Minute Alapati Taupo in those roles.

== 2024 elections to the Parliament of Tuvalu ==
Voting in the general election that was held on 26 January 2024 began at 8:00 local time (UTC+12:00), and ended at 16:00.

Six new MPs were elected to Tuvalu's 16-member parliament. Significant changes to the composition of the parliament include the incumbent Prime Minister Kausea Natano, as well as Puakena Boreham – the only female member of the legislature – not retaining their seats. The former Governor General Sir Iakoba Italeli Taeia was elected as an MP and also Feleti Teo, who was the former Executive Director of the Western and Central Pacific Fisheries Commission (WCPFC).

Enele Sopoaga, the prime minister from 2013 to 2019, was re-elected in the Nukufetau electorate. Former foreign minister Simon Kofe retained his seat in the Funafuti electorate.

No candidates contested the sitting MPs Seve Paeniu, who was the finance minister, and Namoliki Sualiki in the electorate of Nukulaelae, so they were automatically returned to parliament.

Feleti Teo was appointed as prime minister on 26 February 2024, after he was elected unopposed by the parliament.

== See also ==
- List of by-elections in Tuvalu
- Politics of Tuvalu
- List of Tuvalu MPs
- List of political parties by country
- Electoral calendar
- Electoral system
