= List of by-elections in Tuvalu =

This is a list of by-elections to the Parliament of Tuvalu since the First Parliament in 1977, with the names of the incumbent and victor. There are no political parties in Tuvalu, but some by-elections enhanced or reduced a government's parliamentary majority.

The information for this article dates from 1989 onwards. Information on earlier by-elections is not presently available.

== First Parliament (1977-1981) ==
No information known at present.

== Second Parliament (1981-1985) ==
No information known at present.

== Third Parliament (1985-1989) ==
By-election	Date	Incumbent	Winner	Cause	Outcome
1989 Nukulaelae by-election	November 1989	Televa Tevasa	Bikenibeu Paeniu	Televa Tevasa died in October 1989.	Bikenibeu Paeniu voted with the government of Dr. Tomasi Puapua.

== Fourth Parliament (1989-1993) ==
No information known at present.

== Fifth Parliament (1993) ==
No information known at present.

== Sixth Parliament (1993-1998) ==
Information incomplete. No known by-elections in 1997 or 1998.

== Seventh Parliament (1998-2002) ==
Information incomplete.

The Electoral Provisions (Parliament) Act of Tuvalu was amended in May 2000 to increase the membership of parliament from 12 to 15 MPs. Special elections were held in November 2000 to fill the new positions. The following 3 MPs attended their first parliamentary session on 7 December 2000.

Namoto Kelisiano, representing Nanumaga
Amasone Kilei, representing Nui
Saufatu Sopoanga, representing Nukufetau

== Eighth Parliament (2002-2006) ==
By-election	Date	Incumbent	Winner	Cause	Outcome
Nanumea	5 May 2003	Sio Patiale	Sio Patiale	Procedural flaw in the initial election.	Government retains crucial seat.
Niutao	5 May 2003	Saloa Tauia	Tavau Teii	Death.	Opposition gain.
Nukufetau	10 October 2003	Faimalaga Luka	Elisala Pita	Appointment as Governor General.	Gain provides government with the necessary majority to retain power.
Nukufetau	7 October 2004	Saufatu Sopoanga	Saufatu Sopoanga	Prime Minister's resignation following motion of no confidence.	Saufatu Sopoanga is re-elected and becomes deputy prime minister and a minister in the government led by Maatia Toafa.
Nanumea	15 June 2005	Sio Patiale	Kokea Malua	Ill-health.	Malua won by a margin of 59 votes.
Nui	1 June 2005	Amasone Kilei	Taom Tanukale	Death	Government increases majority.
Nanumaga	August 2005	Namoto Kelisiano	Halo Tuavai	As a professional engineer, Kelisiano resigned "in order to run Nanumaga's power plant at the request of his home community".	Government increases majority.

== Ninth Parliament (2006-2010) ==
No known by-elections.

== Tenth Parliament (2010-2015) ==
By-election	Date	Incumbent	Winner	Cause	Outcome
Nui	24 August 2011	Isaia Italeli	Pelenike Isaia	Death.	Telavi Ministry retains crucial seat.
Nukufetau	28 June 2013	Lotoala Metia	Elisala Pita	Death.	Opposition obtains a one-seat majority in Parliament.
Nui	10 September 2013	Taom Tanukale	Leneuoti Maatusi	Resignation.	Sopoaga Ministry increases majority.
Nanumaga	14 January 2014	Falesa Pitoi	Otinielu Tausi	Seat declared vacant by the Governor-General due to the ill health of Dr. Falesa Pitoi.	The Sopoaga government obtains a two thirds majority in Parliament.
Nanumea	19 September 2014	Willy Telavi	Satini Manuella	Incumbent retires from politics, a year after having been ousted as prime minister.	Government increases its majority.

In the 2011 Nui by-election Pelenike Isaia, the widow of Isaia Italeli who had died in July 2011, was elected by the constituency of Nui. Pelenike Isaia becoming the second woman to enter the Parliament of Tuvalu. Although there are no political parties in Tuvalu, Members of Parliament align themselves with the government or with the opposition, and Italeli's death had resulted in prime minister Willy Telavi's government losing its one-seat majority in parliament. The by-election was thus highly important to the government's survival.

The 2013 Nukufetau by-election was due to the death of finance minister Lotoala Metia in December 2012. The government delayed the by-election for six months, despite protests from the Opposition. When the Chief Justice of the High Court of Tuvalu ordered that it be held, it was won comfortably by opposition candidate Elisala Pita.

A constitution crisis developed as Willy Telavi refused to re-call parliament as he argued that the Constitution of Tuvalu only required parliament to be summonsed once a year and so that he had until December 2013 to call parliament. The governor-general Iakoba Italeli then proceeded to exercise his reserve powers to order Mr Telavi's removal and the appointment of Enele Sopoaga as interim prime minister. The Governor General also ordered that Parliament sit on Friday 2 August to allow a vote of no-confidence in Mr Telavi and his government. Telavi then proceeding to write to Queen Elizabeth II (as the head of state of Tuvalu) informing her that he was dismissing Mr Italeli from his position as governor-general.

On Friday 2 August Willy Tevali faced a motion of no confidence, the voting was eight for the motion, four against and one abstention - the speaker abstained from voting on the motion. On Sunday 4 August the parliament elected Enele Sopoaga as prime minister;

During the parliamentary crisis Taom Tanukale, the health minister, resigned from parliament (and thus also from the government). The 2013 Nui by-election was held on 10 September. The government of Enele Sopoaga had a majority of two going into the by-election. Leneuoti Maatusi was declared the winner, polling 297 of the 778 registered voters. Maatusi has been a civil servant and served as the Secretary of the Nui Falekaupule. He beat Palemene Anelu, a recent graduate of the University of the South Pacific, who received 206 votes and Taom Tanukale, the sitting member, whose resignation from parliament caused the by-election, who received 160 votes. After the by-election Leneuoti Maatusi committed to support prime minister Enele Sopoaga.

The 2014 Nanumaga by-election was called because Falesa Pitoi had been unable to attend parliament due to illness. In late 2013, following an assessment of Pitoi's health, the governor-general declared a vacancy for the constituency of Nanumaga in accordance with Section 99 (2) of the Tuvalu Constitution. The polling date for the by-election occurred on a 14 January 2014 and the candidates were Halo Tuavai, Otinielu Tauteleimalae Tausi and Pai Teatu. Otinielu Tausi was the successful candidate. Tausi supported Prime Minister Enele Sopoaga, which gave the government a two-thirds majority of the members of parliament.

The 2014 Nanumea by-election was called following the resignation of Willy Telavi in August. The voting occurred on 19 September 2014. The candidates were Satini Manuella and Hilia Vavae. Satini Manuella was the successful candidate. The former USP senior accountant and president of the Tuvalu National Private Sector Organization (TNPSO) joined the government benches, supporting prime minister Sopoaga.

== Eleventh Parliament (2015-2019) ==
By-election	Date	Incumbent	Winner	Cause	Outcome
Vaitupu	19 July 2017	Apisai Ielemia	Isaia Vaipuna Taape	On 5 October 2016, Apisai Ielemia was determined by the High Court of Tuvalu not to be qualified to be a member of Parliament.	Sopoaga Ministry increases majority.
Funafuti	20 November 2018	Sir Kamuta Latasi	Simon Kofe	Sir Kamuta Latasi resigned as MP on 17 October 2018.	Opposition retains seat.

Apisai Ielemia was elected to represent Vaitupu in the 2015 general election. On 5 October 2016 Chief Justice Sweeney of the High Court of Tuvalu declared that Ielemia's parliamentary seat was vacant as he was not qualified to be a member of Parliament. This was due to the short time the opposition MP had served time in jail following his conviction on 6 May 2016 in the Magistrate's Court on charges of abuse of office during the final year of his term as prime minister (August 2006 to September 2010). The by-election was won by pro-government candidate Isaia Vaipuna Taape. Taape was sworn in as a member of parliament for Vaitupu on Wednesday 16 August 2017.

== Twelfth Parliament (2019 - 2023) ==
By-election	Date	Incumbent	Winner	Cause	Outcome
2022 Niutao by-election	6 June 2022	Katepu Laoi	Sa'aga Talu Teafa	Katepu Laoi died on 8 April 2022.	Teafa joins Natano Ministry.
2022 Nanumaga by-election	15 July 2022	Minute Alapati Taupo	The Reverend Dr Kitiona Tausi	Minute Alapati Taupo died on 23 May 2022	Tausi joins Natano Ministry.
2023 Nukufetau by-election	30 June 2023	Fatoga Talama	Panapasi Nelesoni	Death of Fatoga Talama	Nelesone joins Natano Ministry.
