= List of Tuvalu MPs, 2010–2015 =

This is a list of members of the Parliament of Tuvalu or Palamene o Tuvalu who were elected at the 2010 Tuvaluan general election or as the result of by-elections during the life of the parliament.

There are no formal parties in Tuvalu. The political system is based on personal alliances and loyalties derived from clan and family connections. The Parliament of Tuvalu is rare among national legislatures in that it is non-partisan in nature. It does tend to have both a distinct government and a distinct opposition.

Following the election Maatia Toafa was elected as prime minister; and appointed his cabinet.

On 15 December 2010, prime minister Maatia Toafa's government was ousted in a vote of no confidence, which followed Willie Telavi withdrawing his support for the government. On 25 December 2010 Willy Telavi was elected prime minister and appointed his cabinet.

On 2 August 2013, prime minister Willie Telavi's government was ousted in a vote of no-confidence.

On 4 August 2013 Enele Sopoaga was elected as prime minister. and he appointed his cabinet.

Constituency	Members	Years in parliament
Funafuti	Kausea Natano	2002 ->
Funafuti	Sir Kamuta Latasi	1992 ->
Nanumaga	Monise Lafai	2010 ->
Nanumaga	Dr. Falesa Pitoi	2006-2013; seat declared vacant under s. 99 (2) of the Constitution of Tuvalu because of Dr Pitoi's ill-health.
Nanumaga	Otinielu Tausi	1993-2010; elected in 2014 Nanumaga by-election. ->
Nanumea	Maatia Toafa	2002 ->
Nanumea	Willy Telavi	2006-2014
Nanumea	Satini Manuella	Elected in the 2014 Nanumea by-election following the resignation of Willy Telavi. ->
Niutao	Fauoa Maani	2010 ->
Niutao	Vete Sakaio	2010-2015
Nui	Isaia Italeli	2010-2011
Nui	Pelenike Isaia	2011-2015; elected in the 2011 Nui by-election following the death of her husband.
Nui	Taom Tanukale	2005-2013
Nui	Leneuoti Maatusi	2013-2015; elected in the 2013 Nui by-election following the resignation of Taom Tanukale.
Nukufetau	Enele Sopoaga	2010 ->
Nukufetau	Lotoala Metia	2006-2012
Nukufetau	Elisala Pita	2003-2010; elected in the 2013 Nukufetau by-election following the death of Lotoala Metia. ->
Nukulaelae	Namoliki Sualiki	2006 ->
Vaitupu	Apisai Ielemia	2002 ->
Vaitupu	Taukelina Finikaso	2006 ->

Preceded by List of Tuvalu MPs, 2006–2010	Parliament of Tuvalu; 2010–2015	Succeeded by List of Tuvalu MPs elected 2015
