= Politics of Tuvalu =

The politics of Tuvalu takes place in a framework of a parliamentary representative democratic monarchy, whereby the monarch is the head of state, represented by the governor-general, while the prime minister is the head of government. Executive power is exercised by the government.

The Constitution of Tuvalu states that it is "the supreme law of Tuvalu" and that "all other laws shall be interpreted and applied subject to this Constitution"; it sets out the Principles of the Bill of Rights and the Protection of the Fundamental Rights and Freedoms. In 1986 the Constitution adopted upon independence was amended in order to give attention to Tuvaluan custom and tradition as well as the aspirations and values of the Tuvaluan people. The changes placed greater emphasis on Tuvaluan community values rather than Western concepts of individual freedom. The Constitution of Tuvalu Act 2023, further addressed the role of Tuvaluan culture, and also referred to the climate crisis, and Tuvalu’s statehood and national boundaries.

Tuvalu follows the Westminster system of representative democracy although Tuvalu is a non-partisan democracy and elections in Tuvalu take place without reference to formal political parties. At the date of independence there were 12 members of the Parliament of Tuvalu. Amendments to the Electoral Provisions (Parliament) Act in 1999 and 2000 increased the membership of parliament to 15 MPs. The Electoral Provisions (Parliament) Amendment Act 2019 increased the number of elected representatives for the electorate of Nukulaelae to become 2 MPs. So that each of the 8 island electorates is represented by 2 MPs, with Niulakita being represented by the MPs from Niutao.

The 16 members of the current parliament are elected from eight two-seat constituencies via plurality block voting.

Tuvaluans participated in the political institutions of the Gilbert and Ellice Islands Colony during the transition to self-determination. A referendum was held in December 1974 to determine whether the Gilbert Islands and Ellice Islands should each have their own administration. As a consequence of the referendum the Gilbert and Ellice Islands colony ceased to exist on 1 January 1976 and the separate British colonies of Kiribati and Tuvalu came into existence.

In 2008 Tuvaluans rejected a constitutional referendum that proposed replacing the Queen of Tuvalu, with an elected president as the head of state.

== Executive branch ==
Main office-holders
Office	Name	Party	Since
Monarch	King Charles III	—N/a	8 September 2022
Governor-General	Temukisa Auina Penehuro Hauma	—N/a	30 September 2026
Prime Minister	Feleti Teo	Independent	26 February 2024

King Charles III—as the King of Tuvalu—is the head of state, represented by the governor-general, who is appointed by the King on advice of the Prime Minister of Tuvalu. The prime minister is elected by the members of the parliament. The members also elect the Speaker of the Parliament of Tuvalu who is the presiding officer of the parliament. The ministers that form the cabinet are appointed by the governor-general on the advice of the prime minister. The Attorney-General sits in parliament, but does not vote: the parliamentary role of the Attorney-General is purely advisory. The current Attorney-General is Laingane Italeli Talia.

The Office of the Prime Minister supports the prime minister and the deputy prime minister and also has responsibility for the public service, the police, immigration, broadcasting and media. The Cabinet of Tuvalu consists of the Prime Minister and eight ministers, who are allocated the portfolios made up of the government departments that each minister supervises.

During the governments of Bikenibeu Paeniu, Ionatana Ionatana, and Faimalaga Luka, members of parliament who were not ministers were appointed to positions described variously as ‘Special Ministerial Advisers” and “Parliamentarians with Special Responsibilities” and, in one case, as Chairman of a Public Service Reform Committee. A decision of the High Court of Tuvalu in 2003 determined that “Cabinet did not have the power to make these appointments and the purported use of such a power was unlawful.”

== Judicial branch ==
Tuvalu maintains an independent judiciary consisting of a High Court, Magistrates Court on Funafuti and Island Courts and Lands Courts on each island. Appeals in relation to land disputes are made to the Lands Courts Appeal Panel. Appeals from the Island Courts and the Lands Courts Appeal Panel are made to the Magistrates Court, which has jurisdiction to hear civil cases involving up to $10,000. The superior court is the High Court of Tuvalu as it has unlimited original jurisdiction and hears appeals from the lower courts. The senior judicial officer is the Chief Justice of Tuvalu. Rulings of the High Court can be appealed to the Court of Appeal of Tuvalu. From the Court of Appeal, there is a right of appeal to His Majesty the King in Council, i.e., the Privy Council in London. No cases have been filed from Tuvalu in the Judicial Committee of the Privy Council yet, but it is available as an option.

The law of Tuvalu comprises the Acts voted into law by the Parliament of Tuvalu and statutory instruments that become law; certain Acts passed by the Parliament of the UK (during the time Tuvalu was either a British protectorate or British colony); the common law; and customary law (particularly in relation to the ownership of land).

== Legislative branch ==
The legislative branch is the unicameral Parliament of Tuvalu or Palamene o Tuvalu has 16 members, elected for a four-year term in 8 double-seat constituencies, so that each of the 8 island electorates is represented by 2 MPs, with (Niulakita is represented by the MPs from Niutao). During the time that Tuvalu was a British dependency, the parliament was called the House of Assembly or Fale I Fono.

== Ombudsman ==
In 2014, the office of the Chief Ombudsman was established, with the appointment of Sa'aga Talu Teafa. The primary role of the Chief Ombudsman is to work to achieve good governance through the enforcement of the Leadership Code Act.

== Democratic values in Tuvalu ==
=== Democratic, non-partisan politics ===
Democratic values in Tuvalu are strong with free elections every 4 years by universal adult suffrage. There are no formal political parties so all candidates are non-partisan, and election campaigns are largely on the basis of personal/family ties and reputation. Tuvalu has "about 6,000 eligible voters" – a little over half the country's population.

Members of parliament have very close ties to the island they represent. Often the northern islands in the country compete against the southern islands with the center holding the balance of power. Traditional chiefs also still play a significant role in influencing island affairs, particularly on the outer islands. A long-held distinction between chiefs and commoners is slowly disappearing, and chiefs are now more often selected on merit rather than by birth.

Te Kakeega II is the statement of the national strategy for the sustainable development of Tuvalu, with goals intended to be achieved in the period 2005 to 2015. After consultations on each islands the National Summit on Sustainable Development (NSSD), was held at the Tausoalima Falekaupule in Funafuti from 28 June to 9 July 2004. The meeting resulted in the Malefatuga Declaration, which is the foundation of Te Kakeega II.

In November 2020 the name "Te Kakeega” was replaced by “Te Kete” which is the name of a domestic traditional basket woven from green or brown coconut leaves. Symbolically, “Te Kete” has biblical significance for Tuvaluan Christian traditions by referencing to the basket or the cradle that saved the life of Moses.

=== Representation of women ===
Throughout the history of the Parliament of Tuvalu three women have been elected: Naama Maheu Latasi, from 1989 to 1997; and Pelenike Isaia who was elected in a by-election in 2011, serving until the 2015 general election; and Dr Puakena Boreham was elected to represent Nui in the 2015 general election, serving until the 2024 general election.

The under-representation of women in the Tuvalu parliament was discussed during a consultation entitled "Promoting Women in Decision Making" was held in Funafuti in May 2010. The outcome was a recommendation for the introduction of two new seats, to be reserved for women. The Tuvaluan Ministry for Home Affairs, which has responsibility for women's affairs, stated that steps would be taken to consider the recommendation.

=== The frequent use of the motion of non-confidence in the prime minister ===
Tuvalu does not face serious governance issues. The frequent use of the parliamentary vote of no confidence, engendering many changes of government in relatively short periods, has sometimes been on issues which reflect on the relations between personalities rather than on pressing national issues. The apparent reasons for the resort to motions of no confidence in the prime minister in the period 1999 to 2004 were: the PM straying from policies supported by the majority caucus; claims that the PM was inefficient or ineffective; and accusations of corruption in making appointments.

During this period of time the terms of the prime minister were short. Bikenibeu Paeniu resigned as prime minister following the vote on a motion of no confidence on 27 April 1999. Ionatana Ionatana was elected as prime minister. After the death of prime minister Ionatana on 8 December 2000, Lagitupu Tuilimu was acting prime minister from 8 December 2000 to 24 February 2001. Faimalaga Luka became the prime minister on 24 February 2001 until he was replaced by Koloa Talake after a vote of no confidence on 14 December 2001. Koloa Talake was appointed prime minister until he was voted out of office as a result of the vote at the 2002 Tuvaluan general election.

Following the elections held on 25 July 2002 six of the 15 members elected to parliament were serving for the first time. Saufatu Sopoanga, a former civil servant, became prime minister in August 2002. It was expected that Tuvalu would have a period of political stability. However the Sopoanga government lost its majority in May 2003, following the results of the 2003 Nanumea by-election and the 2003 Niutao by-election. Amasone Kilei, the leader of the opposition, wrote to the governor-general on 10 May 2003 advising that he commanded the support of a majority of the members of parliament and they were ready to form a government. On 20 June 2003 Amasone Kilei commenced an action in the High Court of Tuvalu seeking order regarding the appointment of a speaker and the calling of parliament. As it happened, the governor-general had, on 19 June 2003, issued a notice for the meeting to elect a speaker. In June 2003 opposition MP Faimalaga Luka became speaker of parliament. However parliament was not called. On 6 August 2003 the High Court declined to make the declaration that the prime minister must resign; however the Chief Justice delivered directions as to how the governor-general should proceed to take any action he considers to be appropriate under Section 116(1), acting in his own deliberate judgment, rather than as advised by the cabinet. That is, the governor-general could consider whether it was appropriate to exercise his reserve powers in calling parliament.

On 9 September Sopoanga arranged to appointed opposition MP Faimalaga Luka as governor general, depriving the opposition of its crucial one-seat majority and triggering the 2003 Nukufetau by-election. The winner of the October by-election, Elisala Pita, joined the government's benches, enabling it to survive a while longer. The Sopoanga government was eventually brought down by an eight-to-six motion of no confidence in August 2004. Saufatu Sopoanga resigned as prime minister and member of parliament on 25 August 2004. Two government members, Elisala Pita and Otinielu Tausi, crossed the floor to vote against Sopoanga. The 2004 Nukufetau by-election was held on 7 October and Saufatu Sopoanga regained his seat. Maatia Toafa was elected prime minister on 11 October 2004 with a vote of 8:7; and Saufatu Sopoanga became deputy prime minister and minister for works transport and communication.

Apisai Ielemia became prime minister following the 2006 Tuvaluan general election that was held on 3 August 2006. Many of the incumbent government ministers under the previous government of Maatia Toafa lost their re-election bids for the Tuvaluan parliament. While Apisai Ielemia was re-elected as a member of parliament in the 2010 Tuvaluan general election, he was not re-elected as the prime minister.

These frequent motions of non-confidence and changes of prime minister have been described as having a number of possible explanations: a new generation of politicians who were less deferential to the prime minister as compared to the immediate post-independence parliaments; politicians who were more willing to engage in tactical voting; and competition for the portfolios that come with higher salaries compared to that of an ordinary MP. The larger than usual turnover of MPs at the 2002 and 2006 elections may have indicated a reaction by the electorate to the frequent changes of PM.

There were three prime ministers in the period from 2010 to 2019.

== Recent general elections ==
=== The 2024 general election ===
Voting in the general election that was held on 26 January 2024 began at 8:00 local time (UTC+12:00), and ended at 16:00.

Six new MPs were elected to Tuvalu's 16-member parliament. Significant changes to the composition of the parliament include the former Prime Minister Kausea Natano not retaining his seat; the former Governor General Sir Iakoba Italeli Taeia was elected as an MP and also Feleti Teo, who was the former Executive Director of the Western and Central Pacific Fisheries Commission (WCPFC).

Enele Sopoaga, the prime minister from 2013 to 2019, was re-elected in the Nukufetau electorate. Former foreign minister Simon Kofe retained his seat in the Funafuti electorate. No candidates contested the sitting MPs Seve Paeniu, who was the finance minister, and Namoliki Sualiki in the electorate of Nukulaelae, so they were automatically returned to parliament.

Feleti Teo was appointed as prime minister on 26 February 2024, after he was elected unopposed by the parliament. On 27 February, Sir Iakoba Italeli was elected as the Speaker of the Parliament of Tuvalu in an uncontested ballot.

=== The 2019 general election ===
The 2019 general election was held on 9 September 2019. In the Nukufetau electorate the caretaker prime minister, Enele Sopoaga, was returned to parliament, however Satini Manuella, Taukelina Finikaso and Maatia Toafa, who were ministers, were not returned. Seven new members of Parliament were elected.

On 19 September 2019, in a secret ballot, the members of parliament elected Kausea Natano from Funafuti as prime minister with a 10-6 majority, ending the six-year premiership of Enele Sopoaga. Samuelu Teo was elected as Speaker of the Parliament of Tuvalu.

=== The 2015 general election ===
The general election was held in Tuvalu on 31 March 2015. The state of emergency created by Cyclone Pam resulted in the election being delayed twice. The election was originally scheduled for 19 March, then after Cyclone Pam caused damage to the islands, the election was rescheduled.

In the Nukufetau electorate the caretaker prime minister, Enele Sopoaga, and the caretaker natural resources minister, Elisala Pita, were not opposed by other candidates. Namoliki Sualiki, the caretaker minister for home affairs and rural development, was not opposed in the Nukulaelae electorate. The other islands had contested ballots. The candidates in the constituencies of Niutao and Nui included former members of parliament. On Nui Pelenike Isaia and Leneuoti Matusi were not returned to parliament. On Nuitao Vete Sakaio, the deputy-prime minister, was not elected; the election was otherwise a good result for the government of Enele Sopoaga. Enele Sopoaga was sworn in as prime minister and appointed the ministers to the cabinet on 10 April.

=== The 2010 general election ===
Parliament was dissolved on 13 August 2010, and registration began on 28 August 2010. Twenty-six candidates, including all sitting members of parliament, stood for the fifteen seats in Parliament. In total, ten MPs were re-elected, while five incumbent MPs lost their seats.

== Changes in government (2010-2019) ==
=== Election of the Maatia Toafa government in September 2010 ===
Approximately one and a half weeks after the 2010 general election, a secret ballot was held on 29 September 2010 to determine the country's next prime minister. The incumbent prime minister Apisai Ielemia was not returned to a second term. Maatia Toafa won the ballot with eight votes to seven and become Tuvalu's prime minister. Toafa narrowly defeated Kausea Natano, who received the votes of seven MPs in the ballot. The election results were announced by governor-general Iakoba Italeli and Toafa took office the same day.

=== Maatia Toafa government succeeded by the Willy Telavi government in December 2010 ===
On 24 December 2010, a motion of no confidence against Maatia Toafa was carried by eight votes to seven. On 25 December 2010 Willy Telavi was elected prime minister with an (8:7) majority over Enele Sopoaga.

Minister of Works Isaia Italeli died suddenly in July 2011, which led to a by-election in the Nui constituency in the following month. The election was won by his widow, Pelenike Isaia, who became only the second woman ever to have sat in the Tuvaluan parliament. The by-election was described as "pivotal", as Italeli's death had deprived Prime Minister Willy Telavi of his government's one seat majority in parliament. Pelenike Isaia's election restored it, strengthening the government.

=== The dismissal of the government of Willy Telavi in August 2013 ===
See also; Tuvaluan constitutional crisis

Lotoala Metia, the Minister of Finance, died on 21 December 2012. The calling of a by-election was delayed until the High Court of Tuvalu ordered the prime minister to issue a notice to hold the by-election. The 2013 Nukufetau by-election was held on 28 June. The Nukufetau by-election was won by the opposition candidate Elisala Pita. A constitutional crisis developed when prime minister Telavi responded that, under the Constitution, he was only required to convene parliament once a year, and was thus under no obligation to summon it until December 2013.

Tuvalu's opposition then requested the governor-general Sir Iakoba Italeli to intervene against the prime minister's decision. On 3 July the governor-general exercised his reserve powers in ordering parliament to convene.

The parliament convened on 30 July 2013. In an attempt to avoid a vote of no confidence, prime minister Willy Telavi tabled a motion to dissolve parliament, but this was subsequently defeated by the opposition by 8 votes to 5. The same day Taom Tanukale, the health minister, resigned from the parliament (and thus also from the government). His resignation appeared to be political manoeuvre as Willy Telavi responded by insisting that parliament should be suspended until a by-election was held and declined to call the by-election. In Tuvalu a by-election can only be called when requested by the prime minister.

The governor-general then proceeded to exercise his reserve powers to order Mr Telavi's removal and the appointment of Enele Sopoaga as interim prime minister. The governor-general also ordered that parliament sit on Friday 2 August to allow a vote of no-confidence in Mr Telavi and his government. Telavi then proceeded to write to Queen Elizabeth II (as the head of state of Tuvalu) informing her that he was dismissing Mr Italeli from his position as governor-general. The Queen gave no indication of her reaction to Telavi's letter, leaving Italeli's position secure.

On Friday 2 August, Willy Tevali faced a motion of no confidence; the voting was eight for the motion, four against and one abstention - the speaker of parliament abstained from voting on the motion.

=== The government of Enele Sopoaga 2013-2019 ===
On Sunday 4 August 2013 the parliament elected Enele Sopoaga as prime minister; and Vete Sakaio was subsequently appointed deputy prime minister and minister for public utilities, Maatia Toafa was appointed the minister of finance and economic development and Taukelina Finikaso was appointed the foreign minister.

The 2013 Nui by-election was held on 10 September. Leneuoti Maatusi was declared the winner, polling 297 of the 778 registered voters. Maatusi has been a civil servant and served as the secretary of the Nui Falekaupule. He beat Palemene Anelu, a recent graduate of the University of the South Pacific, who received 206 votes and Taom Tanukale, the sitting member, whose resignation from parliament caused the by-election, who received 160 votes. The government of Enele Sopoaga had a majority of two going into the by-election. After the by-election Leneuoti Maatusi committed to support prime minister Enele Sopoaga.

In December 2013, a vacancy for the constituency of Nanumaga was declared by the governor-general in accordance with Section 99 (2) of the Tuvaluan Constitution following an assessment of Falesa Pitoi's health. The 2014 Nanumaga by-election occurred on 14 January. The candidates were Halo Tuavai, Otinielu Tausi and Pai Teatu. Otinielu Tausi was the successful candidate. Tausi supported prime minister Enele Sopoaga, which gave the government a two-thirds majority of the members of parliament. On 3 March 2014 Tausi was elected as the speaker of the parliament.

In 2015 the parliament was dissolved with a general 2015 general election set down for 19 March 2015. Following the election Enele Sopoaga was sworn in as prime minister. The Sopoaga Ministry lasted until the 2019 general election; following which the Natano Ministry became the government.

== See also ==
- Te Kakeega III - National Strategy for Sustainable Development-2016-2020
- "Te Kete - National Strategy for Sustainable Development 2021-2030" (PDF). Government of Tuvalu. 2020.
