= Alesana Seluka =

Tuvaluan politician

Dr. Alesana Kleis Seluka MBE, OBE

Minister of Finance
- In office 16 October 1989 – 1993
- Prime Minister: Bikenibeu Paeniu
- Preceded by: Kitiseni Lopati
- Succeeded by: Koloa Talake

Minister of Finance
- In office 24 December 1996 – 27 April 1999
- Prime Minister: Bikenibeu Paeniu
- Preceded by: Koloa Talake
- Succeeded by: Lagitupu Tuilimu

Minister of Health
- In office 14 December 2001 – 3 August 2006
- Prime Minister: Koloa Talake; Saufatu Sopoanga; Maatia Toafa
- Preceded by: Ionatana Ionatana
- Succeeded by: Iakoba Italeli

Member of the Tuvaluan Parliament for Nui
- In office 25 November 1993 – 16 September 2010
- Succeeded by: Isaia Italeli; Taom Tanukale

Personal details
- Born: Nui, Gilbert and Ellice Islands (now Tuvalu)
- Party: Independent

Alesana Kleis Seluka (MBE, CBE) is medical doctor by profession and is the Chairman of the Public Service Commission of Tuvalu. He represented the constituency of Nui in the Parliament of Tuvalu. He served as the Minister of Finance and Economic Planning from 1996 until 1999, and Minister of Health from 2001 to 2006 and held other Cabinet posts.

He was made a Member of the Most Excellent Order of the British Empire (MBE), then in 1998 he was made an Ordinary Commander of the Most Excellent Order of the British Empire (CBE) for services to medicine, politics and the community.

== Political career ==
Alesana Seluka was elected to represent Nui and he was returned to parliament in the 1998 Tuvaluan general election.

He was the Minister of Finance and Economic Planning in the 2nd government of Bikenibeu Paeniu (1996 to 1998); and after the 1998 Tuvaluan general election he retained the finance portfolio and was also the Minister for Tourism, Trade and Commerce in the 3rd government of Paeniu, until he resigned as PM following a vote of no confidence on 27 April 1999.

Alesana Seluka was the Minister for Education and Health in the Koloa Talake government (2001–2002).

Alesana Seluka was re-elected in the 2002 Tuvaluan general election; as served as Minister of Health in the government of Saufatu Sopoanga (2002–2004). and in government of Maatia Toafa (2004–2006).

He was again elected in the 2006 Tuvaluan general election; however he was not re-elected in the 2010 Tuvaluan general election.

== Subsequent career ==
He was appointed the Chairman of the Public Service Commission of Tuvalu.

Political offices
Preceded by Koloa Talake	Minister of Finance of Tuvalu; 1996-1999	Succeeded by Lagitupu Tuilimu
Preceded by Kitiseni Lopati	Minister of Finance of Tuvalu; 1989-1993	Succeeded by Koloa Talake
