= Ielemia Ministry =

11th ministry of the Government of Tuvalu

- 11th Cabinet of Tuvalu

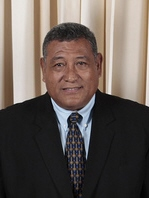
- Date formed: 16 August 2006
- Date dissolved: 29 September 2010

People and organisations
- Head of state: Queen Elizabeth II (represented by Sir Filoimea Telito, later Sir Kamuta Latasi and Sir Iakoba Italeli)
- Head of government: Apisai Ielemia
- Deputy head of government: Tavau Teii
- Member party: Independent
- Opposition leader: Maatia Toafa

History
- Elections: 2006, 2010
- Predecessor: First Toafa Ministry
- Successor: Second Toafa Ministry

The Ielemia Ministry was the 11th ministry of the Government of Tuvalu, led by Prime Minister Apisai Ielemia. It succeeded the First Toafa Ministry following the 2006 election, but was voted out of office after the 2010 election and was succeeded by the Second Toafa Ministry, led by Maatia Toafa.

== The Ielemia Ministry ==
In the 2006 Tuvaluan general election held on August 3, prime minister Maatia Toafa's government was defeated and Apisai Ielemia was elected by the new parliament on August 14 to become the new prime minister. He also became foreign minister.

Sir Kamuta Latasi was appointed the Speaker of the House of Parliament. Sir Tomu Sione was appointed as the Chairman of the Caucus.

Ielemia continued Tuvalu's pursuit of close relations with Republic of China, and in December 2007 visited that country, when various bilateral issues were addressed. He gained a higher international profile during the 2009 United Nations Climate Change Conference in Copenhagen by highlighting the dangers of rising sea levels. In September 2008 Ielemia and the President of Kiribati, Anote Tong, attended a conference to improve relations with Cuba.

Following the 2010 Tuvaluan general election held on 16 September Maatia Toafa was elected as prime minister with the support of five new members of parliament and three members that had supported Prime Minister Apisai Ielemia, this resulted in (8:7) majority in the parliament.

== Cabinet ==
As of September 2006, the government of Prime Minister Apisai Ielemia consisted of the following members:

Officeholder	Office(s)
Apisai Ielemia MP	Prime Minister; Minister for Labour
Tavau Teii MP	Deputy Prime Minister; Minister for Natural Resources and the Environment
Taukelina Finikaso MP	Minister for Communications, Transport and Tourism
Iakoba Italeli MP	Minister for Education, Sports and Health
Lotoala Metia MP	Minister for Finance and Economic Planning
Kausea Natano MP	Minister for Public Utilities and Industries
Willy Telavi MP	Minister for Home Affairs and Rural Development
