= Sopoaga Ministry =

14th ministry of the Government of Tuvalu

- 14th Cabinet of Tuvalu
- Date formed: 5 August 2013
- Date dissolved: 19 September 2019

People and organisations
- Head of state: Queen Elizabeth II (viceregally represented by Sir Iakoba Italeli as Governor-General of Tuvalu)
- Head of government: Enele Sopoaga
- Deputy head of government: Vete Sakaio until 10 April 2015, then Maatia Toafa
- Member party: Independent
- Opposition leader: None

History
- Elections: 2010 (elected PM in 2013), 2015
- Predecessor: Telavi Ministry
- Successor: Natano Ministry

The Sopoaga Ministry was the 14th ministry of the Government of Tuvalu, led by Prime Minister Enele Sopoaga. It succeeded the Telavi Ministry upon its swearing in by Governor-General Sir Iakoba Italeli on 5 August 2013 after the Tuvaluan constitutional crisis was resolved with the dismissal of Willy Telavi.

Following the 2015 general election, Enele Sopoaga was sworn in as prime minister on 10 April. Enele Sopoaga said his administration will focus on working to make Tuvalu less vulnerable to climate change and global economic forces.

The Sopoaga Ministry ended following the 2019 Tuvaluan general election, on 19 September 2019, when the members of parliament elected Kausea Natano from Funafuti as prime minister.

== Cabinet ==
The ministry was sworn in on 5 August 2013. The Sopoaga Ministry included number of former high profile Tuvaluan politicians returning to cabinet, including Maatia Toafa, who was Prime Minister of Tuvalu from 2004 to 2006 and again in 2010.

In the 2015 Tuvaluan general election Vete Sakaio, the deputy prime minister and minister for public utilities, was not re-elected to parliament. Following the general election Enele Sopoaga was sworn in as prime minister and appointed the ministers to the cabinet on 10 April. Enele Sopoaga took responsibility for public utilities and appointed Maatia Toafa as deputy prime minister. Satini Manuella was appointed to be the minister for health.

Officeholder	Office(s)
The Rt Hon Enele Sopoaga MP	Prime Minister; Minister for Public Utilities (from 10 April 2015)
The Rt Hon Vete Sakaio OBE MP	Deputy Prime Minister (until 10 April 2015); Minister for Public Utilities (until 10 April 2015)
The Rt Hon Monise Lafai MP	Minister for Communications and Transport
The Rt Hon Fauoa Maani MP	Minister for Education, Youth, Sport and Health (until 10 April 2015); Minister for Education, Youth and Sport (from 10 April 2015)
The Rt Hon Satini Manuella MP	Minister for Health (from 10 April 2015)
The Rt Hon Taukelina Finikaso MP	Minister for the Environment, Foreign Affairs, Labour and Trade
The Rt Hon Maatia Toafa OBE MP	Minister for Finance and Economic Development; Deputy Prime Minister (from 10 April 2015)
The Rt Hon Pita Elisala OBE MP	Minister for Works and Natural Resources (until 22 August 2016)
The Rt Hon Puakena Boreham MP	Minister for Works and Natural Resources (from August 2016)
The Rt Hon Namoliki Sualiki MBE MP	Minister for Home Affairs

== Program of the Sopoaga Ministry ==
=== Climate change and renewable energy policies ===
When he was appointed prime minister in 2013, Enele Sopoaga said he would ensure the country was given a strong voice in the fight against climate change.

Enele Sopoaga made a commitment under the Majuro Declaration, which was signed on 5 September 2013, to implement power generation of 100% renewable energy (between 2013 and 2020). This commitment is proposed to be implemented using Solar PV (95% of demand) and biodiesel (5% of demand). The feasibility of wind power generation will be considered.

On 16 January 2014, Prime Minister Enele Sopoaga established the National Advisory Council on Climate Change, which functions are “to identify actions or strategies: to achieve energy efficiencies; to increase the use of renewable energy; to encourage the private sector and NGOs to reduce greenhouse gas emissions; to ensure a whole of government response to adaptation and climate change related disaster risk reduction; and to encourage the private sector and NGOs to develop locally appropriate technologies for adaptation and climate change mitigation (reductions in [greenhouse gas]).”

Following the 2015 general election, the Paris Climate Change Conference (COP21) negotiations and the damage cause by Cyclone Pam were the focus of the Sopoaga Ministry.

=== Improving the governance issues of parliament and Constitutional review ===
In January 2014, Enele Sopoaga also indicated that reform of parliament will be addressed when parliament resumed in March 2014, with a two-thirds majority of members supporting the prime minister, he said that he wanted “to improve the governance issues of parliament, its rules and procedures, also we need to look at the functions of parliament on legislations, but particularly also on policies, to be more involved and based with the people”. On 3 March 2014, prime minister Sopoaga moved a motion without notice to remove Sir Kamuta Latasi. The motion was carried and Otinielu Tausi was subsequently elected as speaker. Prime minister Sopoaga was reported as not having faith in Sir Kamuta’s judgment because of his rulings during the events leading to the change of government, which Sopoaga described as being flawed by "[a]ll sorts of misinterpretations, misapplications of the Constitution and he was a risk to the good governance of Tuvalu."

In 2016, a review of the Constitution of Tuvalu commenced. The Tuvalu Constitutional Review Project was implemented by the United Nations Development Programme (UNDP) and the Government of Tuvalu. The project reviewed executive/parliamentary relations and Tuvalu’s commitments under international law. The project considered the country’s socio-economic and political context, such as the sensitivities over political and religious diversity among Tuvalu’s Christian and religious minorities.

=== The management of fishery resources ===
Tuvalu participates in the Pacific Islands Forum Fisheries Agency (FFA), the Western and Central Pacific Fisheries Commission (WCPFC) and the Nauru Agreement (which addresses the management of tuna purse seine fishing in the tropical western Pacific). The Sopoaga Ministry has promoted initiatives to develop and sustain the management of its fishery. In 2015 Tuvalu has refused to sell fishing days to certain nations and fleets that have blocked Tuvaluan initiatives to develop and sustain their own fishery. In 2016 Dr Puakena Boreham, the Minister of Natural Resources, drew attention to Article 30 of the WCPF Convention, which describes the collective obligation of members to consider the disproportionate burden that management measures might place on small-island developing states.

=== Tuvalu’s least developed country (LDC) status ===
The United Nations designates Tuvalu as a least developed country (LDC) because of its limited potential for economic development, absence of exploitable resources and its small size and vulnerability to external economic and environmental shocks. In 2013, Tuvalu deferred its graduation from least developed country (LDC) status to a developing country to 2015. Prime Minister Enele Sopoaga said that this deferral was necessary to maintain access by Tuvalu to the funds provided by the United Nations's National Adaptation Programme of Action (NAPA), as "Once Tuvalu graduates to a developed country, it will not be considered for funding assistance for climate change adaptation programmes like NAPA, which only goes to LDCs". Tuvalu had met targets so that Tuvalu was to graduate from LDC status. Prime minister Sopoaga wants the United Nations to reconsider its criteria for graduation from LDC status as not enough weight is given to the environmental plight of small island states like Tuvalu in the application of the Environmental Vulnerability Index (EVI).
