= 2013 Nui by-election =

- 10 September 2013
Candidate	Leneuoti Maatusi	Palemene Anelu	Taom Tanukale
Party	Independent	Independent	Independent
Popular vote	297	206	160
Percentage	44.79%	31.07%	24.13%
MP before election
Taom Tanukale
Independent
Elected MP
Leneuoti Maatusi
Independent

A by-election was held in the Nui constituency in Tuvalu on 10 September 2013. It was triggered by the resignation of the incumbent, MP Taom Tanukale, the Minister for Health, in the government of Willy Telavi.

== Result of the by-election ==
The Nui by-election was held on 10 September 2013. Leneuoti Maatusi was declared the winner, polling 297 of the 778 registered voters. Matusi has been a civil servant and served as the Secretary of the Nui Falekaupule. He beat Palemene Anelu, a recent graduate of the University of the South Pacific, who received 206 votes and Taom Tanukale, who received 160 votes. Nui is a two-seat constituency, and in the 2010 general election it had returned Isaia Italeli and Taom Tanukale with 24.6% and 23% of the vote respectively, ahead of three other candidates.

The second member of parliament from Nui is Pelenike Isaia, who was elected following the death of her husband Isaia Italeli, in the 2011 Nui by-election.

== Background to the Nui by-election ==
Although there are no political parties in Tuvalu, Members of Parliament align themselves with the government or with the Opposition. A constitutional crisis developed in 2013 when Willy Telavi, the Prime Minister of Tuvalu, refused to recall Parliament following the 2013 Nukufetau by-election. Tuvalu's opposition then requested the Governor-General Iakoba Italeli to intervene against the Prime Minister's decision not to recall Parliament. On 3 July 2013 the Governor-General exercised his reserve powers in ordering Parliament to convene. When the Parliament met on 30 July, the Speaker (Kamuta Latasi) refused to allow a debate on a no-confidence motion in the government of Willy Telavi. Taom Tanukale, the Health Minister then resigned from Parliament (and thus also from the government). This resignation appeared to be political manoeuvre as Willy Telavi responded by insisting that Parliament should be suspended until a by-election was held and declined to call the by-election. In Tuvalu a by-election can only be called when requested by the Prime Minister.

The Governor-General Iakoba Italeli then proceeded to exercise his reserve powers to order Mr Telavi's removal and the appointment of Enele Sopoaga as interim prime minister. The Parliament subsequently confirmed the appointment of Enele Sopoaga as prime minister. The government of Enele Sopoaga had a majority of two going into the by-election. Leneuoti Maatusi, elected in the by-election, committed to support Prime Minister Enele Sopoaga.

== Results ==
Nui by-election, 2013
Party	Candidate	Votes	%	±%
Independent	Leneuoti Maatusi	297	44.79%	
Independent	Palemene Anelu	206	31.07%	
Independent	Taom Tanukale	160	24.13%	
Majority		91		
Independent hold		Swing	n/a	

== See also ==
- List of by-elections in Tuvalu
