= 2017 Vaitupu by-election =

Election in Tuvalu

A by-election was held in the Vaitupu constituency in Tuvalu on 19 July 2017. It was triggered by incumbent MP Apisai Ielemia's dismissal from the seat by court order. It was won by political newcomer Isaia Vaipuna Taape.

== Background ==
Elected to the national Parliament as MP for Vaitupu in the 2015 general election, former Prime Minister Apisai Ielemia sat on the benches of the opposition to Prime Minister Enele Sopoaga's government. In May 2016, he was convicted for corruption and abuse of office, having been found to have accepted approximately 19,000 AUS $ from "Japanese and Taiwanese interests" into his personal bank account between late 2009 and mid-2010, when he had been prime minister. He was sentenced to one year in prison. He appealed successfully against his conviction, but was not permitted to resume his seat in Parliament, as Speaker Otinielu Tausi issued a ruling that he was no longer qualified to sit. Upon judicial review of that ruling, Chief Justice Charles Sweeney found: "When The Hon. Apisai Ielemia commenced to serve his sentence on 6 May 2016, he became a person who was then disqualified from being elected as a member of Parliament". The judge specified that if Ielemia had, in the context of his appeal, sought "an order staying his sentence of imprisonment [before] he had commenced to serve it", then his seat would not have become vacant, as he would not have been imprisoned.

== Result ==
The by-election took place on 19 July 2017. Neither a full list of candidates nor specific results have been published. Candidate Isaia Taape, a "political newcomer", was elected with "a little over half the 1,100 votes, 41 votes ahead of Melton Paka Tauetia". He joined the benches of the governments parliamentary majority; the result thus constituting a government gain from the opposition.
