= Fauoa Maani =

Tuvaluan politician

Minister for Education, Youth, Sports and Health
- In office 5 August 2013 – 19 September 2019
- Prime Minister: Enele Sopoaga
- Preceded by: Falesa Pitoi (Education, Youth and Sport); Taom Tanukale (Health)
- Succeeded by: Timi Melei

Minister for Health
- In office 29 September 2010 – 24 December 2010
- Prime Minister: Maatia Toafa
- Preceded by: Iakoba Italeli
- Succeeded by: Taom Tanukale

Member of the Tuvaluan Parliament for Niutao
- In office 16 September 2010 – 19 September 2019

Personal details
- Party: Independent

Fauoa Maani is a Tuvaluan politician.

He worked as a journalist and served as clerk to the national Parliament, and was named Member of the Order of the British Empire (MBE) in 2009, a title awarded to him in recognition of his "public service and service to the community".

The following year, he went into politics, standing for Parliament in the 2010 general election and was elected as MP for the constituency of Niutao. Following the election, he was appointed as Minister for Health in Prime Minister Maatia Toafa's Cabinet. He lost office just three months later, when Toafa's government was brought down by a motion of no confidence.

On 5 August 2013 Maani became the Minister of Education, Youth, Sports and Health; and served as the minister during the Sopoaga Ministry.
