= 2014 Nanumea by-election =

By-election in Tuvalu

A by-election was held in the Nanumea constituency in Tuvalu on 19 September 2014. It followed the resignation of the incumbent, Willy Telavi, in August.

== Context ==
Willy Telavi had been Prime Minister of Tuvalu until August 2013, when he had been ousted in a parliamentary vote of no confidence, having lost his majority. He was absent for much of the parliamentary year that followed, tending to his sick wife in Hawaii, and reportedly resigned because of the need to remain at his wife's side.

Nanumea is a two-seat constituency. The other seat, held by Finance Minister Maatia Toafa, is not affected by the by-election. Telavi sat on the Opposition benches, and prior to the by-election Prime Minister Enele Sopoaga's government had a two-thirds majority in Parliament. The outcome of the by-election therefore did not affect the government's majority.

== Result ==
Satini Tulaga Manuella was the successful candidate. The former USP Senior Accountant and president of the Tuvalu National Private Sector Organization (TNPSO) supports the government of Enele Sopoaga. There were only two candidates, and the results were as follows:

Nanumea by-election, 2014
Party	Candidate	Votes	%	±%
Nonpartisan	Satini Manuella	436	65.2	n/a
Nonpartisan	Hilia Vavae	233	34.8	n/a
Majority		203	30.3	n/a
Government gain from Opposition		Swing	n/a	

== 2010 election ==
In the 2010 general election, the results had been as follows.

Nanumea 2010 general election
Party	Candidate	Votes	%
Independent	Maatia Toafa	531	37.7
Independent	Willy Telavi	443	31.5
Independent	Amuia Tapeva	434	30.8
Willy Telavi hold		Swing	
Maatia Toafa hold		Swing	
