= 2011 Nui by-election =

- 24 August 2011
Candidate	Pelenike Isaia	Leneuoti Maatusi
Party	Independent	Independent
Popular vote	336	274
Percentage	55.08%	44.92%
MP before election
Isaia Italeli
Independent
Elected MP
Pelenike Isaia
Independent

A by-election was held in the Nui constituency in Tuvalu on 24 August 2011. It was triggered by the death of the incumbent, MP Isaia Italeli, the Minister for Works, who died quite suddenly in late July while in Samoa on government business. Although there are no political parties in Tuvalu, Members of Parliament align themselves with the government or with the Opposition, and Italeli's death had resulted in Prime Minister Willy Telavi's government losing its one-seat majority in Parliament. The by-election was thus highly important to the government's survival.

Nui is a two-seat constituency, and in the 2010 general election it had returned Isaia Italeli and Taom Tanukale with 24.6% and 23% of the vote respectively, ahead of three other candidates.

For the by-election, only one seat would be provided for, Tanukale retaining the other. There were only two candidates: Pelenike Isaia, Italeli's widow, who was the candidate supported by Telavi's government; and Leneuoti Maatusi, who had stood unsuccessfully during the general election. Pelenike Isaia was elected with a 62-vote majority, by 336 votes to 274. She declared that she hoped to accomplish what her husband had set out to do, and added that she would be supporting Telavi's government.

Her election made history, as she became only the second woman ever to sit in Tuvalu's Parliament, following Naama Maheu Latasi from 1989 to 1997.

== Result ==
Nui by-election, 2011
Party	Candidate	Votes	%	±%
Independent	Pelenike Isaia	336	55.1%	
Independent	Leneuoti Maatusi	274	44.9%	
Majority		62	10.1%	
Pro-government independent hold		Swing	n/a	

== 2010 result ==
2010 general election: Results for Nui
Party	Candidate	Votes	%	±%
Independent	Isaia Italeli	263	24.6	
Independent	Taom Tanukale	246	23	
Independent	Seluka Seluka	203	19	
Independent	Iopu Iupasi	200	18.7	
Independent	Leneuoti Maatusi	159	14.8	

== See also ==
- List of by-elections in Tuvalu
