= 2015 Tuvaluan general election =

- 31 March 2015

All 15 seats in the Parliament of Tuvalu
	First party
Party	Independents
Seats before	15
- Results by constituency
Prime Minister before election
Enele Sopoaga
Subsequent
Prime Minister
Enele Sopoaga

General elections were held in Tuvalu on 31 March 2015. The state of emergency created by Cyclone Pam resulted in the election being delayed twice. The election was originally scheduled for 19 March, then after Cyclone Pam caused damage to the islands, the election was rescheduled for 26 March.

== Electoral system ==
The 15 members of Parliament were elected in eight constituencies. Fourteen members were elected under multiple non-transferable vote, while one was elected using first-past-the-post voting. Seven islands were two-seat constituencies, whilst Nukulaelae was a single-member constituency.

== Results ==
In the Nukufetau electorate the caretaker prime minister, Enele Sopoaga, and the caretaker natural resources minister, Elisala Pita, were not opposed by other candidates. Namoliki Sualiki, the caretaker minister for home affairs and rural development, was not opposed in the Nukulaelae electorate.

The other islands had contested ballots. In the constituencies of Nui and Niutao there were 5 and 6 candidates respectively, including former members of parliament. On Nui Pelenike Isaia and Leneuoti Matusi were not returned to parliament. On Nuitao Vete Sakaio, the deputy-prime minister, was not re-elected; the election was otherwise a good result for the government of Enele Sopoaga.

Enele Sopoaga was sworn in as prime minister and appointed the ministers to the cabinet on 10 April.

Constituency	Candidate	Votes	%	Notes
Funafuti	Kausea Natano	423	38.0	Re-elected
Funafuti	Kamuta Latasi	372	33.0	Re-elected
Funafuti	Pugameau Naseli Kaituumana	206	18.0	
Funafuti	Kalepou Tili	125	11.0	
Nanumanga	Otinielu Tausi	327	37.0	Re-elected
Nanumanga	Monise Lafai	315	36.0	Re-elected
Nanumanga	Lutelu Faavae	242	27.0	
Nanumea	Satini Manuella	524	33.3	Re-elected
Nanumea	Maatia Toafa	515	33.0	Re-elected
Nanumea	David Manuvasa Manuella	273	17.0	
Nanumea	Hilia Vavae	229	14.5	
Nanumea	Kata Pulusi	36	2.3	
Niutao	Samuelu Teo	410	28.5	Elected
Niutao	Fauoa Maani	328	23.0	Re-elected
Niutao	Tomu Sione	300	21.0	
Niutao	Iopu Kaisala	165	11.5	
Niutao	Vete Sakaio	142	10.0	Unseated
Niutao	Tavau Teii	90	6.0	
Nui	Mackenzie Kiritome	249	27.0	Elected
Nui	Puakena Boreham	237	26.0	Elected
Nui	Leneuoti Matusi	227	25.0	Unseated
Nui	Pelenike Isaia	150	16.5	Unseated
Nui	Taom Tanukale	53	5.5	
Nukufetau	Enele Sopoaga	Unopposed		Re-elected
Nukufetau	Elisala Pita	Unopposed		Re-elected
Nukulaelae	Namoliki Sualiki	Unopposed		Re-elected
Vaitupu	Apisai Ielemia	653	34.0	Re-elected
Vaitupu	Taukelina Finikaso	574	30.5	Re-elected
Vaitupu	Melton Paka Tauetia	481	25.5	
Vaitupu	Foliaki Paolo	171	9.1	
Vaitupu	Muau Monise	2	0.1	
Source: Fenui News, RNZ
