= Mackenzie Kiritome =

Tuvaluan politician

Mackenzie Kiritome MP
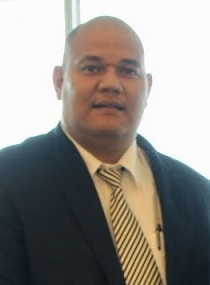
- Kiritome in 2017

Member of the Tuvaluan Parliament for Nui
- Incumbent
- Assumed office 31 March 2015
- Preceded by: Pelenike Isaia; Leneuoti Matusi

Personal details
- Party: Independent

Mackenzie Kiritome is a Tuvaluan politician, elected to represent Nui in the 2015 Tuvaluan general election. He was re-elected in the 2019 general election, and again in the 2024 Tuvaluan general election.

Mackenzie Kiritome was born in Kiribati and now lives in Tuvalu. He is the owner of Mackenzie Trading Limited, which since 2008, has operated small retail outlets in the outer islands to sell merchandise. In 2010 the business employed 40 people. Mackenzie Trading Limited competes with the Co-operative Society.
