= Falesa Pitoi =

Tuvaluan politician

Dr. Falesa Pitoi
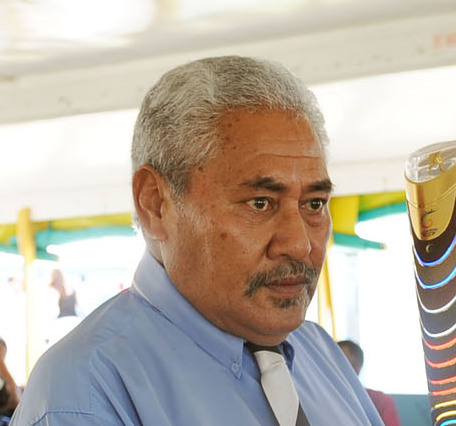
- Pitoi in 2010

Minister for Education, Youth and Sport
- In office 24 December 2010 – 2 August 2013
- Prime Minister: Willy Telavi
- Preceded by: Namoliki Sualiki
- Succeeded by: Fauoa Maani

Member of the Tuvaluan Parliament for Nanumaga
- In office 3 August 2006 – 11 December 2013
- Succeeded by: Otinielu Tausi

Personal details
- Party: Independent

Falesa Pitoi is a Tuvaluan politician and dentist.

A dentist by profession, he began his career in national politics when he was elected to Parliament in the August 2006 general election as MP for Nanumaga. He then served for a time as Minister for Education under Prime Minister Apisai Ielemia.

He was re-elected in the September 2010 general election. In December of that year, Prime Minister Maatia Toafa was ousted in a motion of no confidence. Dr. Pitoi supported Toafa's opponent, Willy Telavi, who became Prime Minister and appointed Pitoi as Minister for Education, Youth and Sport.

In January 2013, he was taken ill while on a visit to Cuba, and was hospitalised. Although he subsequently travelled to New Zealand, by April he had not returned to Tuvalu, and was reportedly still too ill to resume his duties. His absence potentially left the government short of a workable parliamentary majority. The government had not convened Parliament since the death of Finance Minister Lotoala Metia in December 2012; with Pitoi absent, it had only six active MPs to the Opposition's seven. He remained out of the country, reportedly recovering, in July 2013, when the government was ordered by Governor-General Sir Iakoba Italeli to reconvene Parliament and allow a motion of no confidence to be tabled. Following Prime Minister Telavi's removal by the Governor General on 1 August in the context of a political crisis (Telavi had sought to govern without the support of Parliament), Pitoi (still outside the country) and the rest of Cabinet were voted out of office a day later by Parliament, where the opposition now had a clear majority.

Foreign Affairs Minister Taukelina Finikaso said in September 2013 that the Tuvaluan Parliament was looking at a possible by-election for Pitoi's seat following his long absence. In December 2013, Governor-General Iakoba Italeli declared a by-election for the Nanumaga constituency seat following a medical report on Dr Pitoi's health.
