= 2004 Nukufetau by-election =

- 7 October 2004

One of the two Nukufetau seats in the Parliament of Tuvalu. Elected by simple majority using first past the post.
Party	Independent	Independent	Independent

A by-election was held in the Nukufetau constituency in Tuvalu on 7 October 2004. It was triggered by Saufatu Sopoanga resigning as prime minister and member of parliament following the vote on a motion of no confidence on 25 August 2004. A by-election was held on 7 October 2004 and Saufatu Sopoanga regained his seat. Maatia Toafa was elected prime minister on 11 October 2004 with a vote of 8:7; and Saufatu Sopoanga became Deputy Prime Minister and Minister for Works Transport and Communication.
