= 2014 Nanumaga by-election =

- 14 January 2014
Candidate	Otinielu Tausi	Halo Tuavai	Pai Teatu
Party	Independent	Independent	Independent
Popular vote	-	-	-
Percentage	-	-	-

A by-election was held in the Nanumaga constituency in Tuvalu on 14 January 2014. It followed the seat being declared vacant because of the ill-health of the incumbent Opposition MP Dr. Falesa Pitoi, on health grounds.

== Context ==
Dr. Pitoi, a dentist, had served as one of the two MPs for Nanumaga since 2006, and had been appointed Minister for Education, Youth and Sport in Prime Minister Willy Telavi's government on 24 December 2010. In January 2013, he was taken seriously ill while on an official visit to Cuba. He was hospitalised, and later travelled to New Zealand for further treatment. His prolonged absence from Parliament contributed to the Telavi government losing its parliamentary majority; Pitoi and the rest of Cabinet were voted out of office by Parliament on 2 August. Though still absent from the country, Pitoi was now officially an Opposition MP to the new government led by Prime Minister Enele Sopoaga.

In December 2013, Governor-General Sir Iakoba Italeli declared Pitoi's seat vacant in accordance with Section 99 (2) of the Tuvalu Constitution following a medical report on his health; he had now been away from the country for eleven months. Consequently, a by-election was announced to replace him. Monise Laafai retained the other Nanumaga seat, for which he had been elected in 2010.

The Sopoaga government hoped to win Pitoi's vacant seat from the Opposition, which would grant the government a two thirds majority in Parliament, and enable it in particular to elect a new Speaker, replacing Sir Kamuta Latasi, whom Sopoaga accused of being partisan.

== Candidates ==
Three candidates stood in the by-election: former Speaker, former deputy Prime Minister and former MP for Nanumaga Otinielu Tausi; Halo Tuavai, also a former Nanumaga MP; and Pai Teatu.

== Result and consequences ==
The by-election for the vacancy in the Nanumaga electorate occurred on 14 January 2014. Otinielu Tausi was the successful candidate. He did not immediately announce whether he supported the government or opposition, but eventually opted to join Prime Minister Enele Sopoaga's parliamentary majority, providing the Prime Minister with a two thirds majority in the Parliament. On 4 March 2014, Tausi was elected Speaker.

Nukufetau by-election, 2013
Party	Candidate	Votes	%	±%
Nonpartisan	Otinielu Tausi			
Nonpartisan	Halo Tuavai			
Nonpartisan	Pai Teatu			
Majority				
Government gain from Opposition				

== 2010 result ==
Nanumaga constituency results
Party	Candidate	Votes	%	±%
Nonpartisan	Monise Laafai	379	41.9	
Nonpartisan	Falesa Pitoi	296	32.7	
Nonpartisan	Otinielu Tausi	230	25.4	
Falesa Pitoi hold		Swing		
Monise Laafai gain from Otinielu Tausi				
