= 2010 Tuvaluan general election =

- 16 September 2010

All 15 seats in the Parliament of Tuvalu
	First party
Party	Independents
Seats before	15
Prime Minister before election
Apisai Ielemia
Subsequent
Prime Minister
Maatia Toafa

Parliamentary elections were held in Tuvalu on 16 September 2010. Voters elected fifteen members of the Parliament to a four-year term. All candidates were independents, as there are no political parties in the country. Ten out of the fifteen incumbent members were re-elected. The remaining five incumbents, including Deputy Prime Minister Tavau Teii, did not retain their seats. The incumbent Prime Minister, Apisai Ielemia, retained his seat in Vaitupu constituency. On 29 September, Maatia Toafa from Nanumea won eight of the fifteen votes to become Prime Minister.

However, on 24 December 2010, after a motion of no confidence, carried by eight votes to seven, Maatia Toafa was replaced by Willy Telavi as Prime Minister of Tuvalu.

Willy Telavi retained a bare majority through the term of his ministry until by-elections were won by candidates that supported the opposition. Willy Telavi attempted to avoid facing a vote of the parliament until he was forced to call parliament following the intervention of the governor-general. On 2 August 2013 Willy Tevali faced a motion of no confidence in the parliament: the voting was eight for the motion, four against. On 4 August the parliament elected Enele Sopoaga as Prime Minister.

== Background ==
Parliament was dissolved on 13 August 2010, and registration began on 28 August. There are no political parties in Tuvalu, so all candidates are non-partisan.

Twenty-six candidates, including all sitting Members of Parliament, stood for the fifteen seats in Parliament. Tuvalu has "about 6,000 eligible voters" – a little over half the country's population.

Many candidates focused on climate change issues including Enele Sopoaga, a former Tuvalu Ambassador to the United Nations and Tuvalu's representative at the UN Climate Change Conference held in Copenhagen in 2009. Sopoaga stood for election in the Nukufetau constituency, and is reportedly considered a "national hero" for his diplomatic work at the Copenhagen Summit on climate change in December 2009. Enele Sopoaga was elected by the voters of Nukufetau.

== Controversy ==
Prime Minister Apisai Ielemia and Communications Minister Taukelina Finikaso, who are relatives, stood for election in the same Vaitupu constituency in the 2010 election. (The top two vote earners in Vaitupu are elected to parliament). Finikaso filed a complaint against Ielemia prior to the election, accusing the Prime Minister of distributing voter registration forms before the official registration date.

== Results ==
There were 6,008 registered voters in the election, and voter turnout was reportedly strong. Voting began at 8 a.m. and closed at 4 p.m. before counting commenced at the country's twelve polling stations.

Prime Minister Ielemia retained his seat to win re-election from his Vaitupu constituency. Ielemia's re-election prospects had been thought to be tenuous before the election.

In total, ten MPs were re-elected, including Speaker Kamuta Latasi, while five incumbent MPs – including deputy Prime Minister Tavau Teii – lost their seats. The announcement that ten sitting MPs had been re-elected was made by Speaker Kamuta Latasi the following day.

Constituency	Candidate	Votes	%	Notes
Funafuti	Kausea Natano	436	42.5	Elected
Funafuti	Kamuta Latasi	302	29.4	Elected
Funafuti	Samuelu Teo	289	28.1	
Nanumaga	Monise Lafai	379	41.9	Elected
Nanumaga	Falesa Pitoi	296	32.7	Elected
Nanumaga	Otinielu Tausi	230	25.4	
Nanumea	Maatia Toafa	531	37.7	Elected
Nanumea	Willy Telavi	443	31.5	Elected
Nanumea	Amuia Tapeva	434	30.8	
Niutao	Fauoa Maani	314	24.5	Elected
Niutao	Vete Sakaio	314	24.5	Elected
Niutao	Tomu Sione	235	18.3	
Niutao	Tavau Teii	218	17.0	Unseated
Niutao	Iopu Iupasi Kaisala	200	15.6	
Nui	Isaia Italeli	263	24.6	Elected
Nui	Taom Tanukale	246	23.0	Elected
Nui	Alesana Seluka	203	19.0	
Nui	Iopu Iupasi	200	18.7	
Nui	Leneuoti Maatusi	159	14.8	
Nukufetau	Enele Sopoaga	490	40.5	Elected
Nukufetau	Lotoala Metia	399	32.9	Elected
Nukufetau	Elisala Pita	322	26.6	
Nukulaelae	Namoliki Sualiki	148	55.8	Elected
Nukulaelae	Vaefitu Luke Paeniu	117	44.2	
Vaitupu	Apisai Ielemia	597	38.7	Elected
Vaitupu	Taukelina Finikaso	541	35.1	Elected
Vaitupu	Ionatana Peia	403	26.2	
Source: Tuvalu News, Psephos

== Aftermath ==
=== Government formation ===
Speaker Latasi originally announced that all fifteen MPs would meet the following week to form a new government. However, the election of a new Prime Minister was not held until 29 September 2010. Incumbent Apisai Ielemia, who became caretaker prime minister after the election, hoped to form a new government, though he ultimately did not have the support in the new parliament. Enele Sopoaga was reported as being a possible challenger for the premiership.

A secret ballot to determine the next prime minister was held on 29 September 2010. Maatia Toafa, who had served as Prime Minister from 2004 to 2006 and the Leader of the Opposition from 2006 to 2010, won the ballot to become Tuvalu's next prime minister with five new members and three members of the previous government. Toafa narrowly defeated Kausea Natano, who received seven votes in the ballot. Toafa took office on the day of his election and named his Cabinet almost immediately. He included a number of first time MPs who had supported his bid for the premiership – including Enele Sopoaga, who became Minister for Foreign Affairs. Isaia Taeia Italeli, the younger brother of Governor General Iakopa Taeia Italeli, became the speaker of parliament.

However, on 15 December 2010, Prime Minister Maatia Toafa's government was ousted in a motion of no confidence, which followed Willie Telavi withdrawing his support for the government. On 25 December 2010 Willy Telavi was elected prime minister with an (8:7) majority over Enele Sopoaga. Kamuta Latasi, was appointed Speaker.

=== By-elections ===
Minister of Works Isaia Italeli died suddenly in July 2011, which led to the 2011 Nui by-election in the following month. The election was won by his widow, Pelenike Isaia, who became only the second woman ever to have sat in the Tuvaluan Parliament. The by-election was described as "pivotal", as Italeli's death had deprived Prime Minister Willy Telavi of his government's one seat majority in Parliament. Pelenike Isaia's election restored the one seat majority, of the government of Willy Telavi.

Lotoala Metia, the MP for Nukufetau and Minister of Finance, died on 21 December 2012. The 2013 Nukufetau by-election was held on 28 June. The Nukufetau by-election was won by the opposition candidate Elisala Pita.

=== Constitutional crisis ===
After Pita's victory, a constitutional crisis developed when Prime Minister Telavi responded that, under the Constitution, he was only required to convene Parliament once a year, and was thus under no obligation to summon it until December 2013. Tuvalu's opposition then requested the Governor-General Iakoba Italeli to intervene against the Prime Minister's decision. On 3 July, Italeli exercised his reserve powers in ordering Parliament to convene, against the Prime Minister's wishes, on 30 July.

The Governor-General, Iakoba Italeli, then proceeded to exercise his reserve powers to order Telavi to stand down as prime minister and appointed Enele Sopoaga as interim prime minister. The Governor-General also ordered that parliament sit on Friday 2 August to allow a vote of no-confidence in Telavi and his government.

On 2 August 2013 Willy Tevali faced a motion of no confidence in the parliament: the voting was eight for the motion, four against and one abstention. On 4 August the parliament elected Enele Sopoaga as Prime Minister.

Sopoaga gained further support in the parliament following the 2013 Nui by-election, and the 2014 Nanumaga by-election. Willy Telavi resigned from parliament in August 2014. The result of the 2014 Nanumea by-election provided further support for the government of Enele Sopoaga. A general election was set down for 19 March 2015.
