= Lagitupu Tuilimu =

Tuvaluan politician

The Right Honourable Lagitupu Tuilimu OBE

Prime Minister of Tuvalu Acting
- In office 8 December 2000 – 24 February 2001
- Monarch: Elizabeth II
- Governor-General: Sir Tomasi Puapua
- Preceded by: Ionatana Ionatana
- Succeeded by: Faimalaga Luka

Minister of Finance of Tuvalu
- In office 27 April 1999 – 14 December 2001
- Preceded by: Alesana Seluka
- Succeeded by: Saufatu Sopoanga

Personal details
- Born: Tuvalu
- Party: Independent
- Profession: Politician

Lagitupu Tulimu is a political figure from the Pacific nation of Tuvalu, who represented the constituency of Nanumea. He served as the acting prime minister, and foreign minister, from 8 December 2000 to 24 February 2001 following the death of incumbent Ionatana Ionatana.

== Early political career ==
He became deputy prime minister and minister of finance in April 1999, when Ionatana Ionatana's government took office. One of the main issues of Ionatana's Government in which Tuilimu served was the country's membership of the United Nations, which Tuvalu assumed in this period.

== Acting Prime Minister of Tuvalu ==
On the death of Ionatana Ionatana on December 8, 2000 Tuilimu served as acting Prime Minister of Tuvalu, until the election of Faimalaga Luka by parliament on February 24, 2001. His assumption of this office came because he had been the deputy prime minister of Tuvalu on the death of Ionatana. This was the first time that a sitting Prime Minister of Tuvalu had died in office.

== Honours ==
Tuilimu was appointed Officer of the Order of the British Empire (OBE) in the 2002 New Year Honours for public and community service.

== See also ==
- Politics of Tuvalu

Preceded by Ionatana Ionatana	Prime Minister of Tuvalu; 2000-2001 Acting	Succeeded by Faimalaga Luka
Preceded by Alesana Seluka	Minister of Finance of Tuvalu; 1999-2001	Succeeded by Saufatu Sopoanga
