= Namoliki Sualiki =

Tuvaluan politician

Namoliki Sualiki Neemia OBE MP
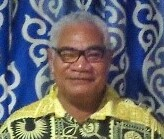
- Sualiki in 2017

Minister for Home Affairs and Rural Development
- In office 5 August 2013 – 9 September 2019
- Prime Minister: Enele Sopoaga
- Preceded by: Pelenike Isaia
- Succeeded by: Katepu Laoi

Minister for Education, Youth and Sport
- In office 29 September 2010 – 24 December 2010
- Prime Minister: Maatia Toafa
- Preceded by: Falesa Pitoi
- Succeeded by: Falesa Pitoi

Member of the Tuvaluan Parliament for Nukulaelae
- Incumbent
- Assumed office 3 August 2006
- Preceded by: Bikenibeu Paeniu

Personal details
- Party: Independent

Namoliki Sualiki Neemia is a Tuvaluan politician.

== Education and career as a teacher ==
He obtained a Master of Education degree at James Cook University in Queensland, Australia, in 1994. His thesis, entitled "Learning for life: up to and beyond the year 2000", explored the social aspects of education and education planning in Tuvalu. He became a teacher. In 2003, he published a booklet entitled Tuvalu Technical Vocational Education and Training, with the government of Tuvalu and NZAID.

== Political career ==
In 2006, he went into politics, and was elected to Parliament as MP for Nukulaelae. He was re-elected in the 2010 general election, and Prime Minister Maatia Toafa appointed him Minister for Education, Youth and Sport. He lost office just three months later, when Toafa's government was brought down by a motion of no confidence.

Namoliki Sualiki was appointed Minister for Home Affairs and Rural Development on 5 August 2013; and served as the minister during the Sopoaga Ministry. He was re-elected in the 2019 general election.

No candidates contested the sitting MPs Seve Paeniu and Namoliki Sualiki in the 2024 general election, so they were automatically returned to parliament.

== Honours ==
In the 2003 New Year Honours he was appointed Member of the Order of the British Empire (MBE), and promoted to Officer of the Order of the British Empire (OBE) in the 2016 New Year Honours, in both cases for public and community service.
