= Isaia Italeli =

Tuvaluan politician (?-2011)

Isaia Italeli Taeia

Minister for Works and Natural Resources
- In office 24 December 2010 – 20 July 2011
- Prime Minister: Willy Telavi
- Preceded by: Vete Sakaio
- Succeeded by: Willy Telavi

Speaker of the Parliament of Tuvalu
- In office 29 September 2010 – 24 December 2010
- Prime Minister: Maatia Toafa
- Preceded by: Kamuta Latasi
- Succeeded by: Kamuta Latasi

Member of the Tuvaluan Parliament for Nui
- In office 16 September 2010 – 20 July 2011
- Preceded by: Iakoba Italeli
- Succeeded by: Pelenike Isaia

Personal details
- Died: 20 July 2011 Apia, Samoa
- Party: Independent

Isaia Italeli Taeia (1960s – 19/20 July 2011), more commonly known as Isaia Italeli, was a Tuvaluan politician.

He was elected to Parliament as MP for Nui in the September 2010 general election, at which time his elder brother, Sir Iakoba Italeli Taeia, was serving as Governor-General.

On 29 September 2010, he was elected Speaker of Parliament. He joined the Opposition to Prime Minister Maatia Toafa's government in December 2010, along with a backbencher and Home Affairs Minister Willy Telavi, enabling the latter to oust Toafa in a motion of no confidence, and replace him. As Prime Minister, Telavi appointed Italeli Minister for Works and Natural Resources.

== Death ==
He was found dead in his room at the Hotel Elisa in the Samoan capital, Apia, on 20 July 2011. He was in Samoa to attend a Forum Fisheries Agency Ministers' Meeting. The Samoan police stated that, although the death was sudden, and Italeli was only in his 40s, the death was "likely" to be of natural causes. He was buried on Nui on 25 July 2011 following a state funeral.

His widow, Pelenike Isaia, succeeded him to Parliament in the resulting by-election the following month, stating she would continue his work, and thus became only the second woman ever to sit in the Tuvaluan Parliament.

== See also ==
- Politics of Tuvalu
