= Apisai Ielemia =

Prime Minister of Tuvalu from 2006 to 2010

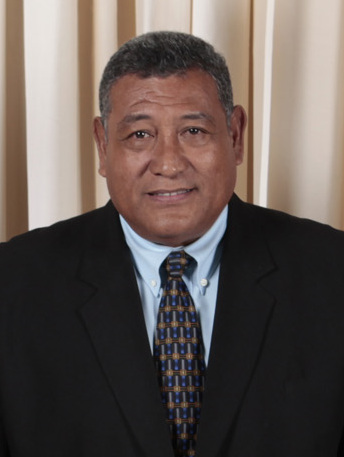
- Ielemia in 2009

10th Prime Minister of Tuvalu
- In office 14 August 2006 – 29 September 2010
- Monarch: Elizabeth II
- Governors General: Filoimea Telito; Kamuta Latasi; Iakoba Italeli
- Preceded by: Maatia Toafa
- Succeeded by: Maatia Toafa

Minister for Foreign Affairs, the Environment, Trade, Labour and Tourism
- In office 24 December 2010 – 2 August 2013
- Prime Minister: Willy Telavi
- Preceded by: Enele Sopoaga (Foreign Affairs, Environment and Labour)
- Succeeded by: Taukelina Finikaso (Minister of Environment, Foreign Affairs, Labour, and Trade)

Personal details
- Born: 19 August 1955
- Died: 19 November 2018 (aged 63) Funafuti, Tuvalu
- Spouse: Sikinala Ielemia

Apisai Ielemia (19 August 1955 – 19 November 2018) was a Tuvaluan politician who served as the tenth Prime Minister of Tuvalu from 2006 to 2010. He also held the role of Foreign Minister.

Ielemia was returned as a member of parliament in the 2010 Tuvaluan general election. He was re-elected to parliament in the 2015 Tuvaluan general election. On 5 October 2016 Chief Justice Sweeney of the High Court of Tuvalu declared that Ielemia’s parliamentary seat was vacant as he was not qualified to be a member of parliament, as the consequence of the short time the opposition MP served time in jail following his conviction on 6 May 2016 in the Magistrate’s Court of charges of abuse of office during the final year of his term as prime minister (August 2006 to September 2010). The abuse of office charges related to payments deposited into a National Bank of Tuvalu personal account. The 5 October 2016 decision of the Chief Justice was controversial as it appeared to contradict the June 2016 decision of Justice Norman Franzi of the High Court of Tuvalu that had quashed Ielemia’s conviction and acquitted him of the abuse of office charges. The appeal to the High Court held that the conviction was "manifestly unsafe," with the court quashing the 12-month jail term.

In an application for leave to appeal his ruling, Chief Justice Charles Sweeney found: "When The Hon. Apisai Ielemia commenced to serve his sentence on 6 May 2016, he became a person who was then disqualified from being elected as a member of Parliament". The judge specified that if Ielemia had, in the context of his appeal, sought "an order staying his sentence of imprisonment [before] he had commenced to serve it", then his seat would not have become vacant, as he would not have been imprisoned.

== Career ==
=== Background ===
Ielemia was elected to serve in the Parliament of Tuvalu by the constituency of Vaitupu on a non-partisan basis: his lack of alignment is not unusual in the politics of Tuvalu, since political parties have not emerged in the country.

=== Prime Minister of Tuvalu ===
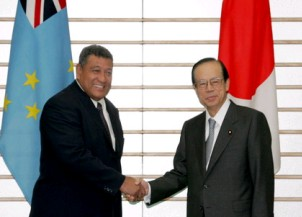
with Yasuo Fukuda (at the Prime Minister's Official Residence on 6 December 2007)

In general elections held on 3 August 2006 prime minister Maatia Toafa's government was defeated and Ielemia was elected by the new parliament on 14 August to become the new prime minister. He also became foreign minister.

Ielemia continued Tuvalu's pursuit of close relations with the Republic of China, and in December 2007 visited that country, where various bilateral issues were addressed. He gained a higher international profile during the 2009 United Nations Climate Change Conference in Copenhagen by highlighting the dangers of rising sea levels. In September 2008 Ielemia and the President of Kiribati, Anote Tong, attended a conference to improve relations with Cuba.

==== Prospects for stability ====
In a country which had in recent years seen frequent changes of government through the use of the parliamentary no confidence device, Ielemia's government, in office since 2006, seemed at the beginning of 2009 to offer somewhat of a rarity: the prospect of a government of Tuvalu running its full course. Prior to Ielemia's appointment as prime minister, the average length of prime ministerial terms of office had been considerably shorter; this history underscored the relative stability of his government, and by extension, the underlying parliamentary system which supported it.

Ielemia was one of 10 MPs who were re-elected to parliament in the 2010 general election.

==== Ministry of Ielemia ====
As of September 2006, the government of Prime Minister Apisai Ielemia consisted of the following members:

- Deputy Prime Minister and Minister of Natural Resources: Hon. Tavau Teii – represented Niutao
- House Speaker: Hon. Sir Kamuta Latasi – represented Funafuti
- Minister of Home Affairs: Hon. Willy Telavi – represented Nanumea
- Minister of Finance & Economic Planning: Hon. Lotoala Metia – represented Nukufetau
- Minister of Public Works, Water & Energy: Hon. Kausea Natano – represented Funafuti
- Minister of Communications, Transportation & Tourism: Hon. Taukelina Finikaso – represented Vaitupu
- Minister of Education, Youth & Sports: Hon Falesa Pitoi – represented Nanumaga
- Minister of Health: Hon. Iakoba Italeli – represented Nui
- Chairman of the Caucus: Hon. Sir Tomu Sione – represented Niutao

=== Subsequent political career ===
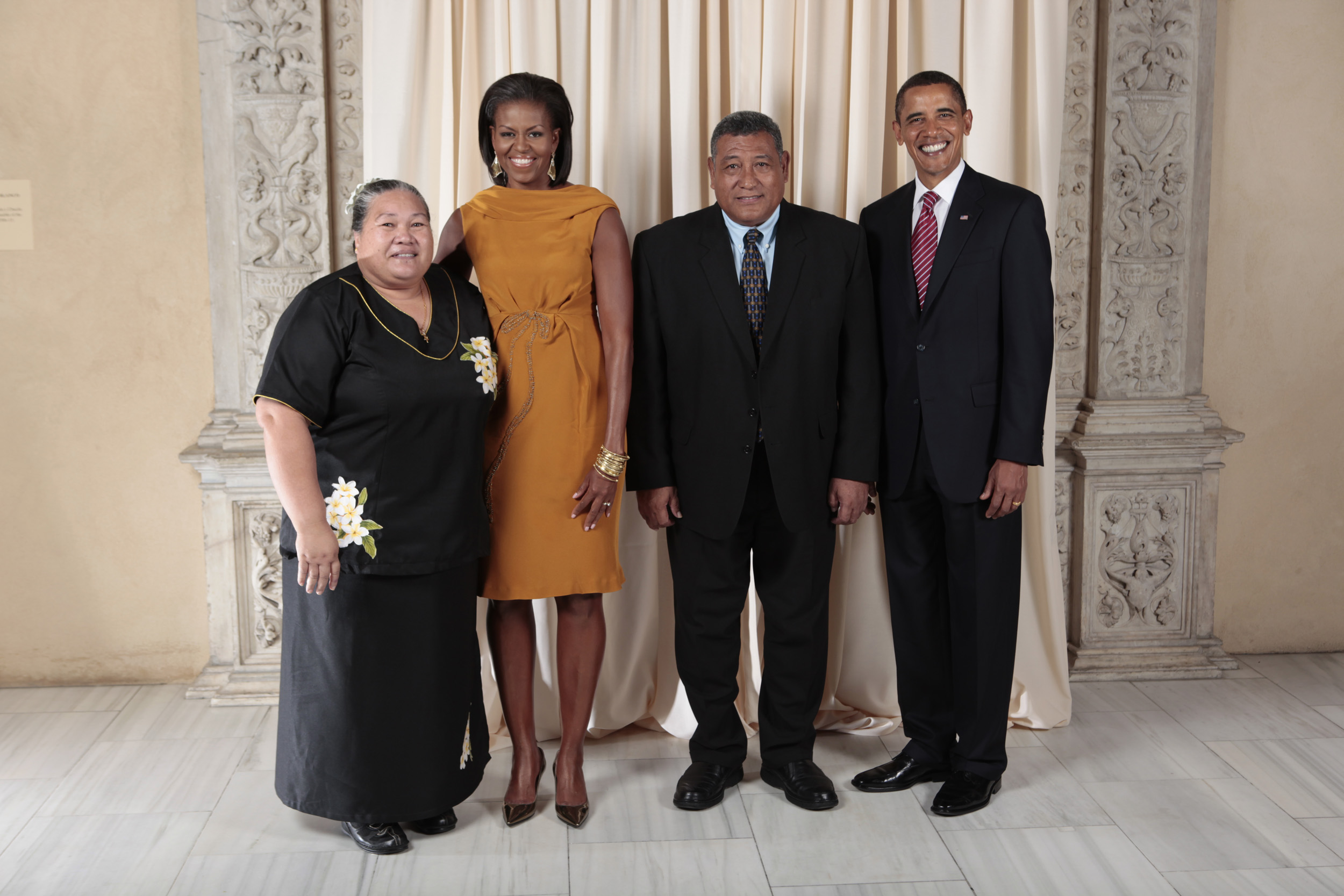
Apisai Ielemia and Sikinala Ielemia with President Barack Obama and First Lady Michelle Obama (2009)

Following the general election held on 16 September 2010 Maatia Toafa was elected as prime minister with the support of five new members of parliament and three members that had supported Prime Minister Apisai Ielemia, this resulted in an 8:7 majority in the parliament.

However, on 15 December 2010 Prime Minister Maatia Toafa's government was ousted in a vote of no confidence and Willy Telavi was elected to the premiership by a slender majority in Parliament (8:7). Ielemia was among Telavi's supporters, and was appointed to the Telavi Ministry as Minister for Foreign Affairs, the Environment, Trade, Labour and Tourism.

Following Prime Minister Telavi's removal by Governor General Sir Iakoba Italeli on 1 August 2013 in the context of a political crisis (Telavi had sought to govern without the support of Parliament), Ielemia and the rest of Cabinet were voted out of office a day later following the no confidence motion.

== Legacy ==
Ielemia died on 19 November 2018 at his home on Funafuti. On 22 November 2018, Tuvalu's patrol vessel, the HMTSS Te Mataili, carried Ielemia's body to his home island, Vaitupu.

Political offices
Preceded by Maatia Toafa	Prime Minister of Tuvalu; 2006–2010	Succeeded by Maatia Toafa
Preceded by Maatia Toafa	Foreign Minister of Tuvalu; 2006–2010	Succeeded by Enele Sopoaga
Preceded by Enele Sopoaga	Foreign Minister of Tuvalu; 2010–2013	Succeeded by Taukelina Finikaso

== See also ==
- Ielemia Ministry
- Politics of Tuvalu
