= Satini Manuella =

Tuvaluan politician

The Honourable Satini Manuella MP

Minister of Health
- In office 10 April 2015 – 9 September 2019
- Prime Minister: Enele Sopoaga
- Preceded by: Taom Tanukale

Member of Parliament
- In office 19 September 2014 – 9 September 2019
- Preceded by: Willy Telavi

Personal details
- Born: 21 August 1958 Tarawa, Kiribati
- Party: Independent
- Spouse: Ilaisita Manuella

Satini Tulaga Manuella is a Tuvaluan politician.

With a background in finance and education, he is, as of 2014, president of the Tuvalu National Private Sector Organisation.

On 19 September 2014, he stood as a pro-government candidate for Parliament in a by-election in the Nanumea constituency. Campaigning on the theme of developing "a healthy working relationship between the education and private sectors", so that Tuvaluans could be "educated in areas that will help boost Tuvalu’s economy", he was elected with 65.2% of the vote, and sat as a backbencher in Prime Minister Enele Sopoaga's parliamentary majority.

On 10 April 2015 he was appointed the Minister of Health; and served as the minister during the Sopoaga Ministry.

He was not re-elected in the 2019 general election.
