= Leneuoti Matusi =

Tuvaluan politician

Leneuoti Matusi MBE MP

Member of the Tuvaluan Parliament for Nui (serving with Pelenike Isaia)
- In office 10 September 2013 – 31 March 2015
- Preceded by: Taom Tanukale
- Succeeded by: Mackenzie Kiritome; Puakena Boreham

Personal details
- Party: Independent

Leneuoti Matusi MBE is a Tuvaluan politician and former civil servant who was elected as an independent MP for the Nui constituency in a 2013 by-election, having previously served as the Secretary of the Nui Falekaupule.

Matusi gained 297 votes out of 778 to gain the seat from the former sitting member Taom Tanukale who polled just 160 votes after resigning from Parliament on 30 July 2013 following the constitutional crisis. He will represent Nui alongside Pelenike Tekinene Isaia, who is the island's only female MP.

A week after the by-election, Prime Minister Enele Sopoaga announced that Matusi had joined the government's side, helping to boost their members to nine.

Matusi was not re-elected to parliament in the 2015 Tuvaluan general election.

He was appointed Member of the Order of the British Empire (MBE) in the 2026 New Year Honours for services to Tuvalu.
