= Pelenike Isaia =

Tuvaluan politician

Pelenike Tekinene Isaia MP

Minister for Home Affairs
- In office 23 September 2011 – 2 August 2013
- Prime Minister: Willy Telavi
- Preceded by: Willy Telavi
- Succeeded by: Namoliki Sualiki

Member of the Tuvaluan Parliament for Nui (serving with Taom Tanukale, then Leneuoti Matusi)
- In office 24 August 2011 – 31 March 2015
- Preceded by: Isaia Italeli
- Succeeded by: Mackenzie Kiritome; Puakena Boreham

Personal details
- Party: Independent

Pelenike Tekinene Isaia served in the Parliament of Tuvalu from 2011 to 2015. Before her election as an MP she worked for the Tuvalu Cooperative Society, as its branch manager in Nui.

Her career in national politics began when she won the August 2011 by-election for the constituency of Nui, and thus entered Parliament. The by-election had been caused by the death of her husband, the incumbent MP and Minister for Works Isaia Italeli. Pelenike Isaia stated she would aim to continue his work, and she was the candidate endorsed by Prime Minister Willy Telavi's government. Italeli's death had deprived the Telavi government of its one-seat majority in Parliament, and when Pelenike Isaia won the by-election, defeating the only other candidate (Leneuoti Maatusi) by a sixty-two vote majority, her victory secured parliamentary support for Telavi. She was appointed Minister for Home Affairs.

She was the second woman ever to have sat in Tuvalu's Parliament, following Naama Maheu Latasi, who was an MP for Nanumea from 1989 to 1997. Isaia's election put an end to Tuvalu being one of the few countries in the world having no female parliamentarians - although the Tuvaluan national Parliament admittedly consists in only fifteen members.

She was also, at the time of her election, sister-in-law to the Governor-General, Iakoba Italeli, her late husband's elder brother.

On 1 August 2013, her brother-in-law the Governor-General dismissed Prime Minister Willy Telavi in the context of a political crisis (Telavi had sought to govern without the support of Parliament). The following day, the rest of Cabinet, Isaia included, was voted out of office by parliament, as the opposition now had a clear majority following a by-election.

Isaia was not re-elected to parliament in the 2015 Tuvaluan general election. Isaia was succeeded as an MP for Nui by Dr Puakena Boreham who is the third woman appointed as a member to the parliament.
