= Taom Tanukale =

Tuvaluan politician

Minister for Health
- In office 24 December 2010 – 30 July 2013
- Prime Minister: Willy Telavi
- Preceded by: Fauoa Maani
- Succeeded by: Fauoa Maani

Member of the Tuvaluan Parliament for Nui
- In office 16 September 2010 – 30 July 2013
- Preceded by: Iakoba Italeli
- Succeeded by: Leneuoti Matusi
- In office 6 May 2005 – 3 August 2006
- Preceded by: Amasone Kilei
- Succeeded by: Iakoba Italeli

Personal details
- Party: Independent

Taom Tanukale is a Tuvaluan politician.

He began his career in national politics when he was elected to Parliament in a by-election in May 2005, as MP for Nui, following the death of his predecessor, Amasone Kilei. He joined Prime Minister Maatia Toafa's parliamentary majority, and was appointed acting Minister for Health and Education, "while the incumbent went overseas for long-term medical treatment".

He failed to retain his seat in the August 2006 general election, but regained it in the September 2010 general election. In December of that year, Prime Minister Maatia Toafa was ousted in a motion of no confidence. Tanukale supported Toafa's opponent, Willy Telavi, who became Prime Minister and appointed him as Minister for Health. On 30 July 2013, as the government appeared to have lost its parliamentary majority and was about to face a motion of no confidence, Tanukale unexpectedly resigned from Parliament (and thus also from the government) altogether. The following day, the reason for his resignation became apparent. The Speaker, Kamuta Latasi, rejected the Opposition's attempt to table a motion of no confidence, on the grounds that there was now a vacant seat in Parliament. Latasi adjourned Parliament, and ruled that it would not reconvene until a by-election had been held - thus prolonging Telavi's minority government. This tactic proved fruitless as Governor General Sir Iakoba Italeli intervened on 1 August 2013 and removed Telavi from office, so as to enable Parliament to function. The following day, Parliament (minus Tanukale) formally brought down the government through a vote of no confidence.

Taom Tanukale was a candidate in the 2013 Nui by-election, which was held on 10 September. Tanukale came third in the poll with 160 votes. Leneuoti Matusi was declared the winner, polling 297 of the 778 registered voters. Tanukale was a candidate in the 2015 Tuvaluan general election and received 53 votes, but was not elected to parliament.
