= Willy Telavi =

Prime Minister of Tuvalu from 2010 to 2013

The Right Honourable Willy Telavi
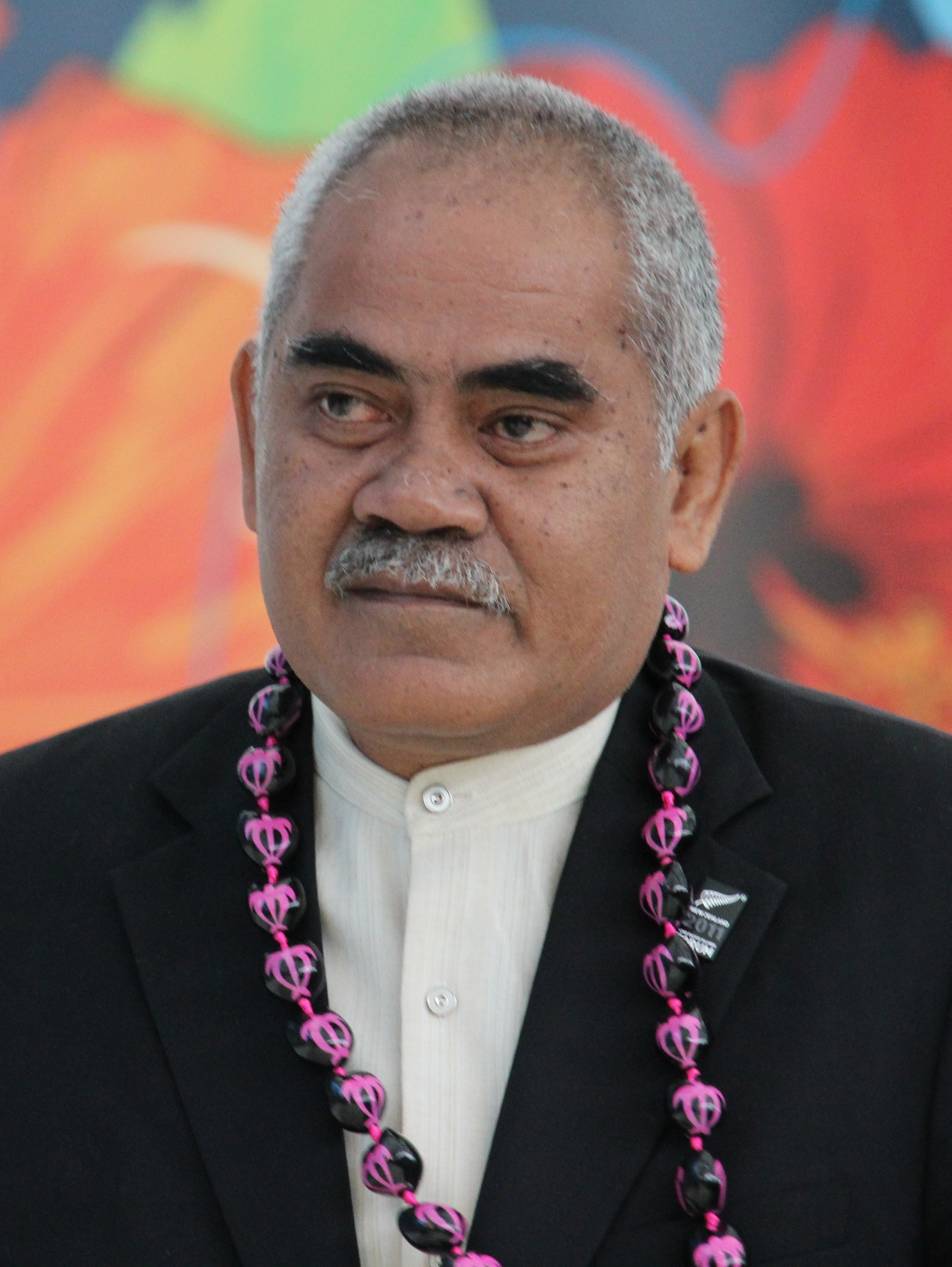
- Telavi in 2011

11th Prime Minister of Tuvalu
- In office 24 December 2010 – 1 August 2013
- Monarch: Elizabeth II
- Governor-General: Iakoba Italeli
- Preceded by: Maatia Toafa
- Succeeded by: Enele Sopoaga

Minister for Home Affairs
- In office 16 August 2006 – 23 September 2011
- Prime Minister: Apisai Ielemia; Maatia Toafa
- Preceded by: Aunese Simati
- Succeeded by: Pelenike Isaia

Member of the Tuvaluan Parliament for Nanumea
- In office 3 August 2006 – 25 August 2014
- Preceded by: Sio Patiale
- Succeeded by: Satini Manuella

Personal details
- Born: 28 January 1954 (age 72) Nanumea, Gilbert and Ellice Islands (now Tuvalu)
- Party: Independent
- Education: University of the South Pacific; Charles Darwin University

Willy Telavi (born 28 January 1954) is a Tuvaluan politician who served as Prime Minister of Tuvalu from 2010 to 2013.

Born in Nanumea, Telavi was first elected to parliament in 2006 and was re-elected in 2010. He became prime minister on 24 December 2010 and the Telavi Ministry retained government until August 2013. The refusal of prime minister Telavi to recall the Parliament of Tuvalu after the 2013 Nukufetau by-election resulted in a constitutional crisis when he adopted the position that, under the Constitution of Tuvalu, he was only required to convene parliament once a year, and was thus under no obligation to summon it until December 2013. The opposition then requested the Governor-General of Tuvalu, Sir Iakoba Italeli, to intervene against the Telavi's decision.

On 3 July, Governor-General Italeli exercised his reserve powers in ordering parliament to convene, against the prime minister Telavi's wishes, on 30 July. On 1 August 2013 Governor-General Italeli again exercised his reserve powers and dismissed Telavi as Prime Minister of Tuvalu and appointed the opposition leader Enele Sopoaga as Tuvalu's caretaker prime minister. A day later, on 2 August 2013, Telavi's government was successfully brought down through a vote of no confidence in parliament. He resigned from parliament in August 2014. He was absent for much of the parliamentary year tending to his sick wife in Hawaii, and he resigned in order to remain at his wife's side.

== Background ==
Telavi is from Nanumea. His career in the Tuvalu police force culminated in his appointment as police commissioner in 1993, a position he held for thirteen years. He earned a degree in legal studies from the University of the South Pacific in 1999 and a master's degree in international management from Northern Territory University in 2000. Willy Telavi was appointed to his current position in May 1993, he has served more than 16 years in various positions with the Tuvalu police force.

== Ministerial office ==
Telavi stood for the Parliament of Tuvalu in 2006 and was elected to serve the constituency of Nanumea. The government of prime minister Apisai Ielemia came to office following the election. Telavi was appointed minister for home affairs in the Ielemia administration.

He retained his seat in parliament in the 2010 general election, and was appointed minister for home affairs in the cabinet of the new prime minister, Maatia Toafa.

== Prime minister ==
In December, just four months after the new government took office, Telavi crossed the floor, joined the opposition and enabled it to bring down the government through a motion of no confidence, carrying it by eight votes to seven. The motion was reportedly initiated due to MPs' concerns over certain aspects of the budget, in particular the prospect that the government may no longer fully fund patients' medical costs abroad. On 24 December Telavi was elected as the prime minister, defeating foreign affairs and environment minister Enele Sopoaga by another 8–7 vote. Appointing his cabinet on the same day, he appointed himself to continue as minister for home affairs. (That position was subsequently given to Pelenike Isaia.)

It was under Telavi's premiership that Tuvalu became, in November 2011, a founding member of the Polynesian Leaders Group, a regional grouping intended to co-operate on a variety of issues including culture and language, education, responses to climate change, and trade and investment.

Under Telavi's leadership, in September 2011, Tuvalu had become one of only six countries to grant diplomatic recognition to Abkhazia as a sovereign state. The two countries, during Telavi's visit, agreed on free movement of each other's citizens between them, without the need for visas. In addition, Telavi was leading a Tuvaluan delegation of electoral monitors for that month's Abkhazian parliamentary election. As a response, Georgia cut off diplomatic relations with Tuvalu.

Telavi delayed calling a by-election after the death of Lotoala Metia, an MP from Nukufetau, until ordered by the High Court to call the by-election. On 28 June 2013, the Telavi government lost a crucial by-election in Nukufetau, which gave the opposition a majority of one in parliament. The opposition immediately called for the government to reconvene parliament. Prime Minister Telavi responded that, under the Constitution, he was only required to convene parliament once a year, and was thus under no obligation to summon it until December 2013. The opposition turned to the governor-general, Iakoba Italeli. On 3 July, Italeli exercised his reserve powers in ordering parliament to convene, against the prime minister's wishes, on 30 July.

On that date, as the government was about to face a motion of no confidence, health minister Taom Tanukale unexpectedly resigned from parliament (and thus also from the government) altogether. He was not the first government member to vacate or temporarily leave office: Lotoala Metia had died (and an opposition member had been elected at the resulting by-election), education minister Falesa Pitoi had become ill and had been outside the country since December 2012. Tanukale's resignation therefore left Telavi with only three active government members other than himself: deputy prime minister Kausea Natano, foreign affairs minister Apisai Ielemia, and home affairs minister Pelenike Isaia (there were no government backbenchers). He also had the support of the Speaker.

The following day, the reason for Tanukale's resignation became apparent. The speaker, Kamuta Latasi, rejected the opposition's attempt to table a motion of no confidence, on the grounds that there was now a vacant seat in parliament. Latasi adjourned parliament, and ruled that it would not reconvene until a by-election had been held – thus prolonging Telavi's minority government once more. However, a day later, on 1 August 2013, the governor-general sent out a proclamation removing Telavi as the prime minister of Tuvalu. He was subsequently replaced by opposition leader Enele Sopoaga, who becomes caretaker prime minister. Opposition member Taukelina Finikaso alleged that the prime minister had attempted to remove Sir Iakoba Italeli as governor-general of Tuvalu, prompting Telavi's removal described as 'upholding' the Tuvaluan constitution. His government was successfully removed from office a day later by Parliament, on 2 August 2013.

Willy Telavi defended his actions in not calling the by-election or recalling parliament, and placed the responsibility for the constitution crisis with the governor general, who he says intervened only five days after the by-election, "Though he got the power to do that, we are a small country where we can consult each other without resorting to this kind of exercising of powers".

== See also ==
- Politics of Tuvalu
- Tuvaluan constitutional crisis
- Telavi Ministry

Political offices
| Preceded by Maatia Toafa | Prime Minister of Tuvalu; 2010–2013 | Succeeded by Enele Sopoaga |
