= Iakoba Italeli =

Tuvaluan politician

Sir Iakoba Italeli GCMG
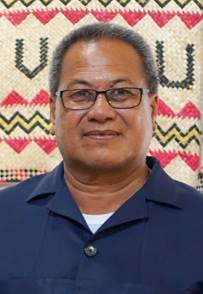
- Italeli in 2015

Speaker of the Parliament of Tuvalu
- Incumbent
- Assumed office 27 February 2024
- Monarch: Charles III
- Prime Minister: Feleti Teo
- Preceded by: Samuelu Teo

Governor-General of Tuvalu
- In office 16 April 2010 – 22 August 2019
- Monarch: Elizabeth II
- Prime Minister: Apisai Ielemia; Maatia Toafa; Willy Telavi; Enele Sopoaga
- Preceded by: Kamuta Latasi
- Succeeded by: Teniku Talesi (acting)

Member of the Tuvaluan Parliament for Nui
- Incumbent
- Assumed office 26 January 2024
- Preceded by: Puakena Boreham
- In office 3 August 2006 – 16 September 2010
- Preceded by: Taom Tanukale
- Succeeded by: Taom Tanukale

Attorney General of Tuvalu
- In office 2002–2006
- Preceded by: Feleti Teo
- Succeeded by: Eselealofa Apinelu

Personal details
- Born: Iakoba Taeia Italeli
- Party: Independent
- Spouse: Koling Italeli Taeia
- Education: University of Malta

Sir Iakoba Taeia Italeli GCMG is a Tuvaluan politician who was the governor-general of Tuvalu from 16 April 2010, until 22 August 2019, when he resigned to contest in the 2019 general election. He was not successful in that election, however he was elected as a member of parliament in the 2024 Tuvaluan general election.

He is also a former attorney general of Tuvalu who served from 2002 to 2006. He was the chancellor of the University of the South Pacific from July 2014 to June 2015.

In 2022 Italeli ran as Tuvalu's candidate to be the next Commonwealth Secretary-General. The aim was to fill the potential vacancy created if incumbent Patricia Scotland were to be prematurely disendorsed by a majority of member states, and to institute a pro-climate action agenda for the entire Commonwealth. At CHOGM 2022 in Kigali, Rwanda, Italeli withdraw after an initial straw poll the votes were ultimately spit between Jamaican candidate Kamina Johnson Smith and Lady Scotland, who was victorious and stayed on as Secretary-General.

== Career ==
Prior to entering politics, Italeli served in the Tuvaluan police force for two decades. He worked his way up from constable to deputy commissioner.

In 2001, Italeli graduated from the International Maritime Law Institute at the University of Malta. He was appointed as acting Attorney General in 2002, a position kept until 2006.

== First term in parliament ==
Italeli ran for public office for the first time in the Tuvaluan general election in 2006. He won the election, and became the representative of the Nui district in the Parliament of Tuvalu, a position kept for 4 more years. He also served as the Minister of Education, Sports and Health, in the government of the Prime Minister, Apisai Ielemia. He remained as minister until 2010 when he was appointed as governor-general.

Italeli was elected to represent Nui in the Parliament of Tuvalu on a non-partisan basis; this lack of alignment is not unusual in the politics of Tuvalu; unusually for Tuvalu, Italeli represented a constituency where trilingualism is a feature, since many inhabitants of Nui originate from Kiribati, and thus speak Gilbertese, in addition to Tuvaluan and English, the fluency of which varies among local people.

His younger brother, Isaia Italeli, was elected to Parliament, also as MP for Nui, in the September 2010 general election, and subsequently became Speaker, then Minister for Works and Natural Resources in the Telavi Ministry.

== Governor-General ==
In 2010, Italeli was appointed Governor-General of Tuvalu by Elizabeth II, Queen of Tuvalu. He was appointed as a Knight Grand Cross of the Order of St Michael and St George (GCMG) on 21 June 2011.

In 2013, Italeli faced a political crisis when Prime Minister Willy Telavi's government lost a crucial by-election on 28 June and thereby lost its majority in parliament. The opposition thereafter held a majority of seats (eight to seven) and immediately called for the Prime Minister to advise that parliament be reconvened. Telavi responded that, under the constitution, parliament was required to convene only once a year and he was thus under no obligation to advise the Governor-General to summon it until December 2013. The opposition turned to Italeli and, on 3 July, he exercised his reserve powers by summoning parliament, against the Prime Minister's wishes, on 30 July. With only five members of the governing party and eight members of the opposition party in the legislature, the Speaker of the Parliament, Kamuta Latasi, still refused to allow a vote of non-confidence and Taom Tanukale, a member of Telavi's party, resigned his seat in parliament, prompting Telavi to assert that no confidence vote should be held until a by-election was conducted in Tanukale's district, but without giving a date for such an election. The opposition subsequently appealed again to the Governor-General, who then, on 1 August, replaced Telavi with the former opposition leader Enele Sopoaga as prime minister and ordered that parliament sit until 2 August to allow for the vote of non-confidence regarding Telavi's government to take place. On the same day, Telavi declared he had written to Elizabeth II, the Queen of Tuvalu, advising her to replace Italeli as governor general and that Italeli "had been fired". The Queen gave no indication of her reaction to Telavi's letter, leaving Italeli's position secure.

== Second term in parliament ==
Italeli was elected as a member of parliament for Nui in the 2024 Tuvaluan general election. He follows the path set by Sir Tomu Sione who returned to the parliament following his term as Governor-General.

On 27 February 2024, Sir Iakoba Italeli was elected as the Speaker of the Parliament of Tuvalu in an uncontested ballot.

== See also ==
- Politics of Tuvalu
- Tuvaluan constitutional crisis

Government offices
Preceded by Kamuta Latasi; Acting	Governor General of Tuvalu; 2010–2019	Succeeded by Teniku Talesi; Acting
Political offices
Preceded by Feleti Teo	Attorney-General of Tuvalu; 2002 – 2006	Succeeded by Eselealofa Apinelu
