= Maatia Toafa =

Prime Minister of Tuvalu (2004–2006; 2010)

The Right Honourable Maatia Toafa OBE MP
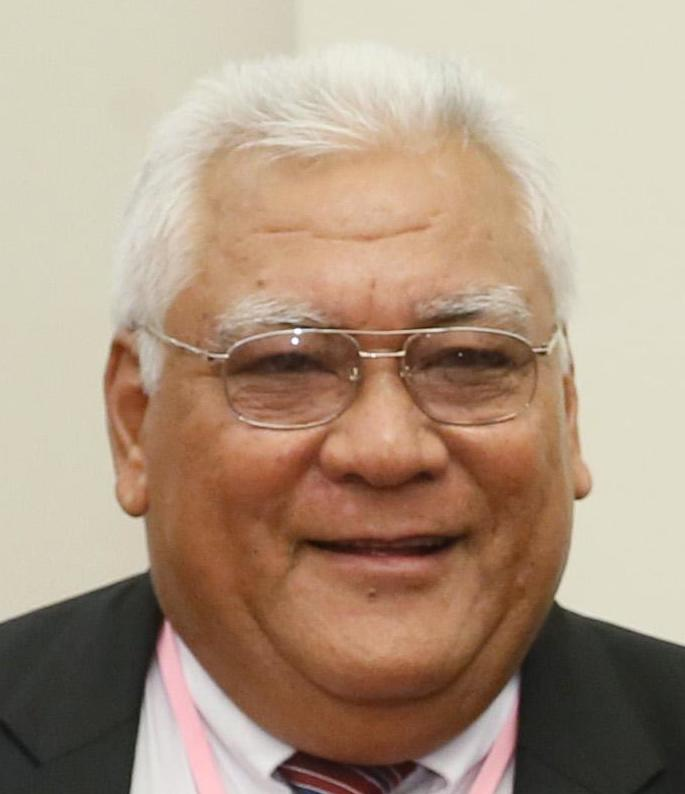
- Toafa in 2016

Deputy Prime Minister of Tuvalu
- In office 10 April 2015 – 9 September 2019
- Prime Minister: Enele Sopoaga
- Preceded by: Vete Sakaio
- Succeeded by: Minute Alapati Taupo

Minister of Finance
- In office 5 August 2013 – 9 September 2019
- Prime Minister: Enele Sopoaga
- Preceded by: Lotoala Metia
- Succeeded by: Seve Paeniu

9th Prime Minister of Tuvalu
- In office 29 September 2010 – 24 December 2010
- Monarch: Elizabeth II
- Governor General: Iakoba Italeli
- Preceded by: Apisai Ielemia
- Succeeded by: Willy Telavi
- In office 11 October 2004 – 14 August 2006; Acting: 27 August 2004 – 11 October 2004
- Monarch: Elizabeth II
- Governor General: Faimalaga Luka
- Preceded by: Saufatu Sopoanga
- Succeeded by: Apisai Ielemia

Member of Parliament
- In office 25 July 2002 – 9 September 2019
- Preceded by: Kokea Malua; Lagitupu Tuilimu
- Constituency: Nanumea

Personal details
- Born: 1 May 1954
- Died: 13 November 2024 (aged 70)
- Party: Independent
- Spouse: Pulafagu Toafa

Maatia Toafa (1 May 1954 – 13 November 2024) was a Tuvaluan politician, representing Nanumea, who served two non-consecutive terms as Prime Minister of Tuvalu. He first served as prime minister, and foreign minister, from 2004 to 2006, from the resignation of his predecessor, Saufatu Sopoanga, until the defeat of his Cabinet in the 2006 general election. From 2004 to 2006 he also held the role of foreign minister.

He was re-elected to parliament in the 2010 general election; and regained the premiership on 29 September 2010; however he lost the support of the parliament following a motion of confidence on 21 December of the same year. On 5 August 2013 Toafa became the Minister of Finance and Economic Development in the government of Prime Minister Enele Sopoaga. He was appointed as deputy prime minister following the 2015 Tuvaluan general election. He was not re-elected in the 2019 general election.

Prior to entering domestic Tuvaluan politics, Toafa worked for the Pacific Islands Forum Secretariat in Suva, Fiji.

Toafa died on 13 November 2024, at the age of 70.

== Prime Minister of Tuvalu (2004–06) ==
Prime Minister Saufatu Sopoanga resigned from Parliament on 27 August 2004, after his government was deposed in a no confidence vote. Toafa, who was deputy prime minister at the time, became acting prime minister as a result of Sopoanga's resignation from office. The 2004 Nukufetau by-election was held on 7 October; Sopoanga was reelected to parliament and parliament reconvened to elect a new prime minister. Toafa was confirmed as prime minister on 11 October 2004 with a vote of 8:7, Toafa also became Minister of Foreign Affairs.

During his term as prime minister Toafa undertook a review of the Constitution of Tuvalu and pledged to hold a referendum on whether the British monarch should be replaced as the Head of State of Tuvalu. The 2008 Tuvaluan constitutional referendum, held during the term of Prime Minister Apisai Ielemia, resulted in a majority vote against establishing a republic.

On Friday 16 September 2005, Toafa represented Tuvalu at the UN '2005 World Summit' discussing the problems faced by Small Island Developing States (SIDS), citing a lack of financial and technical access, Environmental security and infrastructural capacity. Toafa argued for the presence of permanent United Nations, activity in 'isolated' SIDS countries such as Tuvalu. Maatia Toafa emphasized the impact of climate change as a "broader security issue which relates to environmental security. Living in a very fragile island environment, our long-term security and sustainable development is closely linked to issues of climate change, preserving biodiversity, managing our limited forests and water resources."

== Succession and subsequent career ==
Toafa was reelected to Parliament during the 2006 general election, but all of the members of his Cabinet were defeated. On 14 August 2006 he was succeeded as prime minister by Apisai Ielemia. Toafa continued to serve as a member of the Parliament of Tuvalu as the Leader of the Opposition from 2006 until 2010.

== Prime Minister of Tuvalu (2010) ==
Toafa was re-elected to Parliament from his Nanumea constituency in the 2010 Tuvaluan general election.

A secret ballot was held on 29 September 2010, approximately one and a half weeks after the general election, to determine the country's next prime minister. Incumbent Prime Minister Apisai Ielemia, who had succeeded Toafa for the office in 2006, was not returned to second term. Toafa won the ballot with eight votes to become Tuvalu's next prime minister. Toafa narrowly defeated Kausea Natano, who received the votes of seven MPs in the ballot. The election results were announced by Governor-General Iakoba Italeli and Toafa took office the same day.

On 5 October 2010 a week after his appointment as prime minister, Toafa was interviewed on Radio Australia by presenter Geraldine Coutts. Asked if the 15 member parliament had become more stable, after the election of five new MP'S Toafa replied (in reference to his new 8 member cabinet including 5 new MPS) 'Yeah, I think the idea is to get the number right, meaning turn five because 15 altogether. Yeah, once I get the number right, then things can be more stabilised'. He also talked of the challenges the country faced due to the effects of climate change citing coral bleaching, changing weather patterns, water degradation and the effects of increased water salinity upon agriculture as evidence.

Upon taking office, he told Tuvalu News that his government would "work for human security ensuring the basic human needs" of the inhabitants of all nine islands and atolls, in particular by rapidly "build[ing] up the[ir] economic infrastructure". This would require partnerships with donor countries, which he would seek to expand. He would also "work aggressively on the world society to protect small countries" from the effects of climate change.

On 21 December 2010, Toafa and his government were toppled by a parliamentary motion of confidence, by eight votes to seven. His Minister of Home Affairs, Willy Telavi, crossed the floor and enabled the Opposition to bring down the government. The motion was reportedly initiated due to MPs' concerns over certain aspects of the budget, in particular the prospect that the government may no longer fully fund patients' medical costs abroad. With a new prime minister due to be chosen on 24 December, Toafa announced that he would not be standing for the job, but that he hoped his deputy and Foreign Affairs and Environment Minister, Enele Sopoaga, would be chosen by Parliament in his place.

=== Historical note ===
In the history of independent Tuvalu, Bikenibeu Paeniu has been the only other prime minister apart from Maatia Toafa to have served a second period in that office.

== Honours ==
Toafa was appointed Officer of the Order of the British Empire (OBE) in the 2014 New Year Honours list "for public and community service".

== See also ==
- Politics of Tuvalu
- Second Toafa Ministry

Political offices
Preceded by Saufatu Sopoanga	Prime Minister of Tuvalu; 2004–2006	Succeeded by Apisai Ielemia
Preceded by Apisai Ielemia	Prime Minister of Tuvalu; 2010	Succeeded by Willy Telavi
Preceded by Lotoala Metia	Minister of Finance of Tuvalu; 2013-2019	Succeeded by Seve Paeniu
