= Enele Sopoaga =

Prime Minister of Tuvalu from 2013 to 2019

The Right Honourable Enele Sopoaga MP
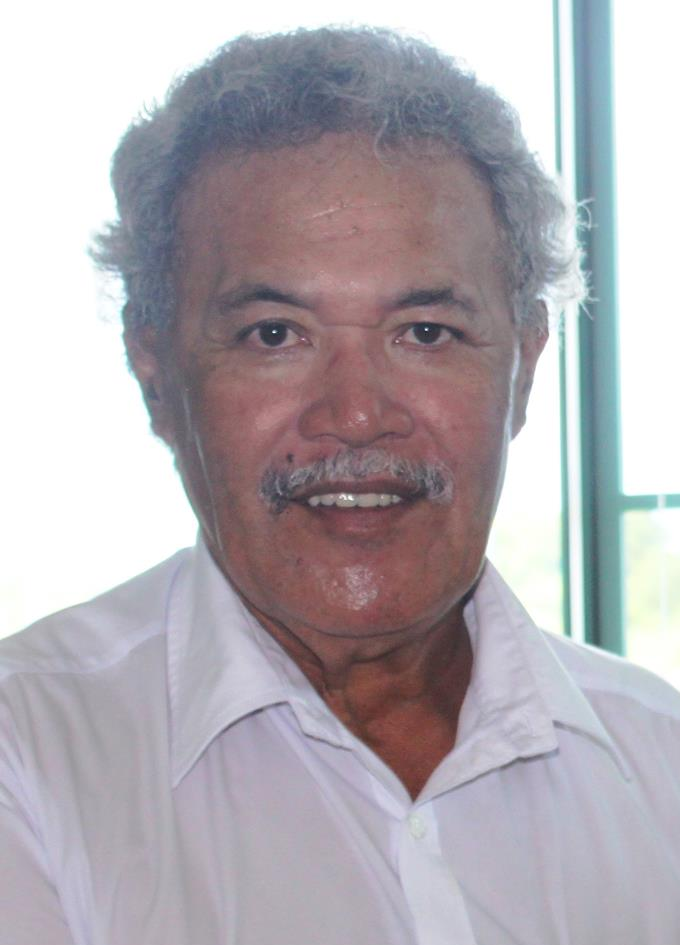
- Sopoaga in 2015

Prime Minister of Tuvalu
- In office 1 August 2013 – 19 September 2019 (Note: Acting: 1 – 5 August 2013)
- Monarch: Elizabeth II
- Governors-General: Iakoba Italeli; Teniku Talesi Honolulu (Acting)
- Deputy: Vete Sakaio; Maatia Toafa
- Preceded by: Willy Telavi
- Succeeded by: Kausea Natano

Foreign Minister
- In office 29 September 2010 – 24 December 2010
- Preceded by: Apisai Ielemia
- Succeeded by: Apisai Ielemia

Member of Parliament for Nukufetau
- Incumbent
- Assumed office 16 September 2010 Serving with Lotoala Metia then Elisala Pita

Permanent Representative of Tuvalu to the United Nations
- In office 3 July 2001 – 19 December 2006
- Prime Minister: Faimalaga Luka; Koloa Talake; Saufatu Sopoanga; Maatia Toafa; Apisai Ielemia
- Secretary General: Kofi Annan
- Preceded by: Office established
- Succeeded by: Afelee F. Pita

Personal details
- Born: 10 February 1956 (age 70)
- Party: Independent
- Spouse: Salilo Enele
- Education: University of Oxford certificate University of Sussex

Enele Sosene Sopoaga PC (born 10 February 1956) is a Tuvaluan diplomat and politician who was Prime Minister of Tuvalu from 2013 to 2019.

Sopoaga was elected to Parliament in the 2010 general election. He served as deputy prime minister and minister for foreign affairs, the environment and labour in Prime Minister Maatia Toafa's short-lived government from September to December 2010. Following an unsuccessful bid for the premiership in December 2010 (with Toafa's support), he became leader of the Opposition to prime minister Willy Telavi's government. He became caretaker prime minister on 1 August 2013 following Telavi's removal by the Governor General, in the context of a political crisis. A day later, on 2 August 2013, the opposition successfully voted out Telavi's government in a no confidence vote. Following this, a ballot was held to elect the new prime minister of Tuvalu and Sopoaga won with 8 votes to 4. He was sworn in on 5 August 2013, and created his ministry the same day.

== Personal life and education ==
Sopoaga received a certificate in diplomatic studies from Oxford University in 1990, and a master's degree from the University of Sussex in 1994. Sopoaga and his wife, Salilo Enele, have three children.

He is the younger brother of Saufatu Sopoaga, who was prime minister from 2002 to 2004.

== Career in administration and diplomacy ==
From 1980 until 1986, Sopoaga served as an Education Administrator within the Ministry of Social Services. He became the Assistant Secretary of the Ministry of Social Services in 1986. He was the Assistant Secretary and European Union National Authorizing Officer, Department of Foreign Affairs (three years), and Ministry of Foreign Affairs and Economic Planning (two years), both between 1986 and 1991. Sopoaga was the acting officer within the Minister of Foreign Affairs and Economic Planning from 1991 until 1992. He then served as the Permanent Secretary (the highest civil service position) and European Union National Authorizing Officer within the Tuvaluan Ministry of Foreign Affairs and Economic Planning from 1992 to 1995. Additionally, Sopoaga served as Tuvalu's High Commissioner to Fiji. He also simultaneously served as the Tuvaluan High Commissioner to both Papua New Guinea and Samoa. From 1995 to 1996, he was the Permanent Secretary in the Ministry of Health, Sports and Human Resource Development.

He subsequently served as his country's Permanent Representative to the United Nations from 2001 (when the Permanent Mission of Tuvalu was established) to 2006. He also served as the vice-chairman of the Alliance of Small Island States (AOSIS) from January 2002. He has been described as "Tuvalu's climate change negotiator", tasked with raising the profile of the dangers posed by climate change in Tuvalu and other small island nations.

== Political career ==
=== Member of the Toafa ministry ===
In 2010, he decided to go into politics, and stood for Parliament in the general election on 16 September 2010. Sopoaga, who was elected to parliament for the Nukufetau constituency was expected to pose a strong challenge to Ielemia for the office of prime minister during the formation of a new government. In the event, however, neither Ielemia nor Sopoaga stood for the premiership, and Maatia Toafa was elected prime minister. Toafa formed a cabinet composed largely of first time MPs who had given him their support, and appointed Sopoaga as deputy prime minister and Minister for Foreign Affairs, the Environment and Labour.

=== Leader of the Opposition ===
Maatia Toafa's government was brought down on 21 December 2010 by a motion of no confidence in Parliament, by eight votes to seven. The motion was reportedly due to MPs' concerns about the budget, and in particular possible restrictions on the government's funding of Tuvaluans' medical costs abroad. With a new prime minister due to be chosen on 24 December, Toafa announced that he would not be standing for the job, but that he hoped Sopoaga would be chosen by parliament in his place. Sopoaga stood for the premiership, but lost to Willy Telavi by seven votes to eight.

Sopoaga thus became the Leader of the Opposition. He continued to call for international initiatives to tackle climate change, including "adaptation techniques", a transfer of affordable sustainable technologies to vulnerable developing nations. This would enable sustainable living, he said, and address the issue of Tuvalu's dependence on donor countries. He told Radio Australia that Tuvalu was now suffering from "long, serious" periods of drought, affecting crops. (See: 2011 Tuvalu drought.) He has also stated that, to respond to the overcrowding of Funafuti, Tuvaluans on the outer islands should be given the economic means to live on their home island rather than move to the capital. One other issue he raised during a talk on Radio Australia was the need for independent media in Tuvalu, presenting news in an accurate rather than "rosy", 'pro-government' manner. He stated that Tuvaluans' "right to correct information is curtailed by censorship".

The latter concern led him to set up, with two other people, the Tala o Matagi newspaper company (meaning "Story of the Wind") in June 2011. Emphasising the people's right to "reliable information" on politics and other issues, for the betterment of themselves and of the nation, he explained that the newspaper would begin as a short, bilingual weekly newsletter in Tuvaluan and English, issued in one or two hundred copies.

In early 2012, he criticised the Telavi government's decision to establish formal diplomatic relations with "countries that have unsettled political issues of concern to the international community" – namely, Abkhazia, South Ossetia, and Armenia (the latter in the context of its territorial dispute with Azerbaijan). Sopoaga suggested that the establishing of diplomatic relations with specific foreign countries should be decided by Parliament, not solely by the Cabinet.

=== Prime minister ===
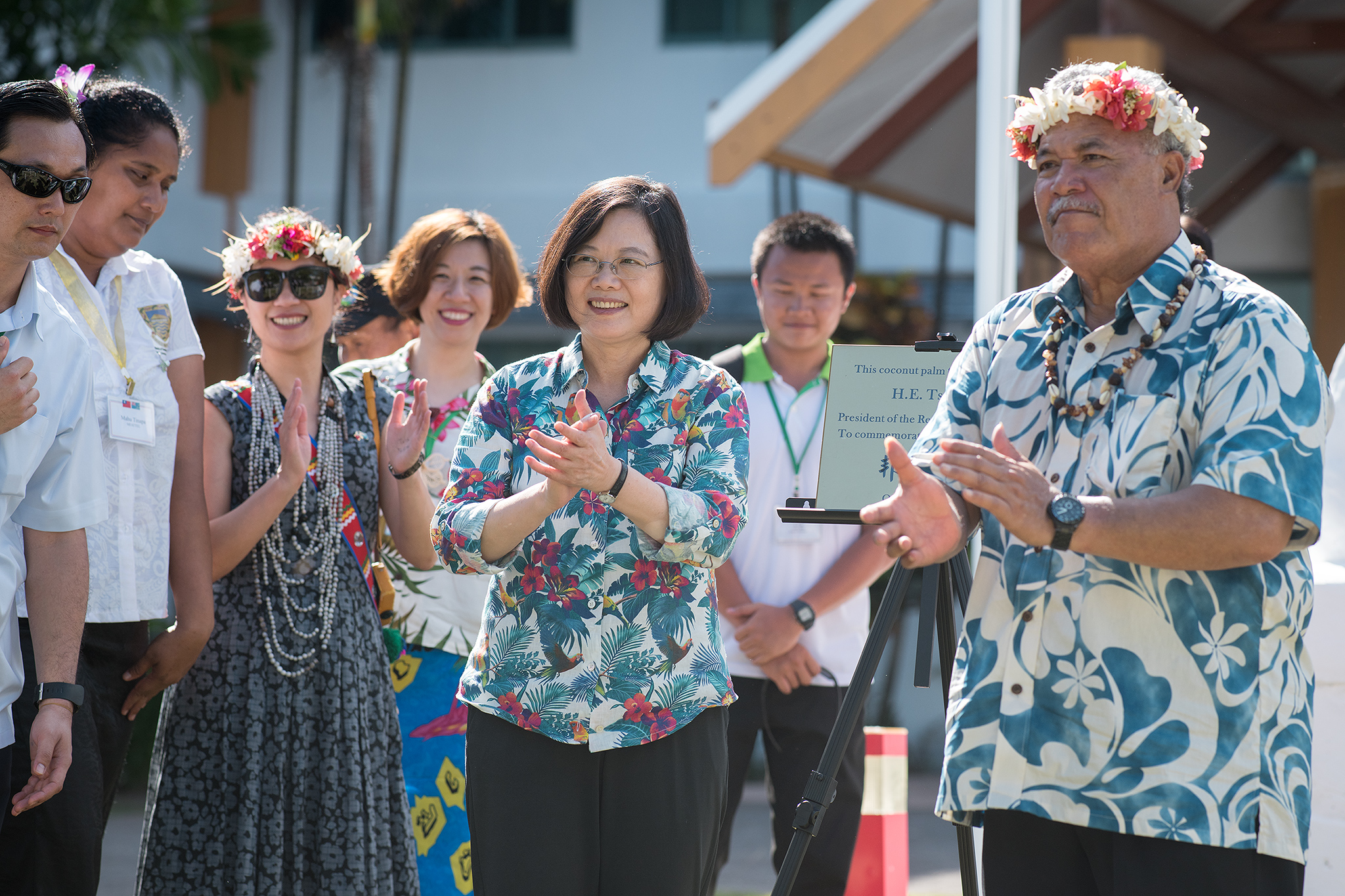
Sopoaga meets with Taiwanese president Tsai Ing-wen in 2017

Sopoaga became prime minister in a caretaker capacity following the dismissal of incumbent Willy Telavi by Governor-General Iakoba Italeli on 1 August 2013. In a secret ballot held during an extra session of parliament three days later, Sopoaga was elect as Prime Minister of Tuvalu by 8 votes to 4. He was sworn in by Italeli on 5 August 2013, and created his ministry the same day. A day after being sworn into office, Sopoaga said he was 'confident' of retaining office in the next general election, and he would ensure the country had a strong voice in the fight against climate change. He promoted a number of high-profile Tuvaluan politicians back to cabinet, including Vete Sakaio who was appointed the Deputy Prime Minister and Minister for Public Utilities; and Maatia Toafa, who was appointed Finance and Economic Development' Maatia Toafa was previously the prime minister of Tuvalu from 2004 to 2006 and again in 2010.

Following the 2015 general election, Enele Sopoaga was sworn in as prime minister on 10 April. Enele Sopoaga said his administration will focus on working to make Tuvalu less vulnerable to climate change and global economic forces.

Enele Sopoaga as Minister for Public Utilities and Infrastructures launched Tuvalu Atoll Science Technology Training Institute (TASTTI) on 20 December 2017.

=== 2019 & 2024 general elections ===
He was re-elected as a member of parliament in the 2019 general election. Following the general election, on 19 September 2019, the members of parliament elected Kausea Natano from Funafuti as prime minister with a 10–6 majority.

He was re-elected as a member of parliament in the 2024 Tuvaluan general election.

== Constitutional reform ==
In 2016 a review of the Constitution of Tuvalu commenced. The Tuvalu Constitutional Review Project was implemented by the United Nations Development Programme (UNDP) and the Government of Tuvalu, when Sopoaga was prime minister. The project reviewed executive/parliamentary relations and Tuvalu's commitments under international law. The project considered the country's socio-economic and political context, such as the sensitivities over political and religious diversity among Tuvalu's Christian and religious minorities.

In July 2020, Enele Sopoaga was appointed to the Constitutional Review Parliamentary Select Committee. The Final Report of the Constitutional Review Parliamentary Select Committee was published on 12 December 2022. The work of the committee resulted in the Constitution of Tuvalu Act 2023, which amended the Constitution of Tuvalu.

== Commitment to address the effects of climate change on Tuvalu ==
=== 2009 United Nations Climate Change Conference (COP15) ===
Enele Sopoaga served as the main spokesman for the Pacific Small Island Developing States (PSIDS) at the 2009 United Nations Climate Change Conference in Copenhagen, and was one of the chief negotiators for global action on climate change, with Tuvalu receiving attention for its strong advocacy on the issue. He proposed amending the draft climate treaty so as to require all countries to limit the rise in global air temperatures to 1.5 degrees Celsius above pre-industrial levels. This proposal was subsequently rejected.

=== 2010 United Nations Climate Change Conference (COP16) ===
Sopoaga, who had described the outcome of the 2009 United Nations Climate Change Conference in Copenhagen as unsatisfactory, led Tuvalu's delegation at the 2010 Conference in Cancun in December, and said of it that he had been "[s]ort of encouraged by the turn around of things. It could have been worse, but I think goodwill prevailed [...] despite a lot of issues still sticking out".

=== 2013 Majuro Declaration ===
As prime minister, Enele Sopoaga has worked on international effects to address the problems resulting from global warming in Tuvalu. In September 2013 Sopoaga said that relocating Tuvaluans to avoid the impact of sea level rise "should never be an option because it is self defeating in itself. For Tuvalu I think we really need to mobilise public opinion in the Pacific as well as in the [rest of] world to really talk to their lawmakers to please have some sort of moral obligation and things like that to do the right thing".

Sopoaga made a commitment under the Majuro Declaration, which was signed on 5 September 2013, to implement power generation of 100% renewable energy (between 2013 and 2020). This commitment is proposed to be implemented using Solar PV (95% of demand) and biodiesel (5% of demand). The feasibility of wind power generation will be considered.

=== Establishing Tuvalu's National Advisory Council on Climate Change ===
On 16 January 2014 prime minister Enele Sopoaga established the National Advisory Council on Climate Change, which functions are "to identify actions or strategies: to achieve energy efficiencies; to increase the use of renewable energy; to encourage the private sector and NGOs to reduce greenhouse gas emissions; to ensure a whole of government response to adaptation and climate change related disaster risk reduction; and to encourage the private sector and NGOs to develop locally appropriate technologies for adaptation and climate change mitigation (reductions in [greenhouse gas]).”

=== 2014 UN Framework Convention on Climate Change at Lima ===
At the 20th Conference of Parties to the UN Framework Convention on Climate Change in December 2014 at Lima, Peru, Sopoaga said "Climate change is the single greatest challenge facing my country. It is threatening the livelihood, security and wellbeing of all Tuvaluans."

=== 2015 United Nations Climate Change Conference (COP21) ===
Prime minister Enele Sopoaga said at the 2015 United Nations Climate Change Conference (COP21) that the goal for COP21 should be a global temperature rise of below 1.5 degrees Celsius relative to pre-industrial levels, which is the position of the Alliance of Small Island States. Sopoaga was appointed the lead spokesperson for the Pacific Small Island Developing States (PSIDS) at COP21. Prime minister Sopoaga said in his speech to the meeting of heads of state and government:

Tuvalu’s future at current warming, is already bleak, any further temperature increase will spell the total demise of Tuvalu…. For Small Island Developing States, Least Developed Countries and many others, setting a global temperature goal of below 1.5 degrees Celsius relative to pre-industrial levels is critical. I call on the people of Europe to think carefully about their obsession with 2 degrees. Surely, we must aim for the best future we can deliver and not a weak compromise.

His speech concluded with the plea:

Let’s do it for Tuvalu. For if we save Tuvalu we save the world.

Enele Sopoaga described the important outcomes of COP21 as including the stand-alone provision for assistance to small island states and some of the least developed countries for loss and damage resulting from climate change and the ambition of limiting temperature rise to 1.5 degrees by the end of the century.

== Published works ==
- Enele Sopoaga, 'Post War Development', Chapter 19 of Tuvalu: A History (1983) Larcy, Hugh (eds.), Institute of Pacific Studies, University of the South Pacific and Government of Tuvalu

Diplomatic posts
New office	Permanent Representative of Tuvalu to the United Nations; 2001–2006	Succeeded by Afelee F. Pita
Political offices
Preceded by Willy Telavi	Prime Minister of Tuvalu; 2013–2019	Succeeded by Kausea Natano
Preceded by Apisai Ielemia	Foreign Minister of Tuvalu; 2010–2010	Succeeded by Apisai Ielemia

== See also ==
- Politics of Tuvalu
- Sopoaga Ministry
