= Cabinet of Tuvalu =

Executive branch of the government of Tuvalu

The Cabinet of Tuvalu is the executive branch of the government of Tuvalu.

It is drawn from, and responsible to, the legislative branch, the unicameral Parliament of Tuvalu. After every legislative election, members of parliament (MPs) elect one of their own as prime minister. The latter then appoints ministers from among the MPs to form a cabinet. (Officially, ministers are appointed by the Governor-General of Tuvalu, who represents the monarch, with the governor-general acting on the advice of the prime minister). Initially, the Constitution provided that the number of members of cabinet (excluding the prime minister) must not be more than one third of the number of members of parliament. This was amended by the Constitution of Tuvalu (Amendment) Act 2007, which provides that up to half of the members of parliament may be appointed to cabinet (in addition to the prime minister). As there are no political parties in Tuvalu, and MPs are independent members representing the interest of their constituency, the prime minister is usually careful to appoint MPs from different parts of the country as cabinet members. There are currently 16 MPs.

The Constitution of Tuvalu states that the cabinet is responsible to parliament. The latter may dismiss it through a vote of no confidence.

== Current Cabinet ==
Following the 2024 Tuvaluan general election, Feleti Teo was appointed as prime minister on 26 February 2024, after he was elected unopposed by the parliament. On 27 February, Teo appointed the members of the Cabinet.

Portfolio	Minister	Constituency	Notes
Prime Minister	Feleti Teo	Niutao	
Deputy Prime Minister & Minister of Finance and Development	Panapasi Nelesoni	Nukufetau	
Minister for Foreign Affairs, Labour, and Trade	Paulson Panapa	Vaitupu	
Minister for Home Affairs, Climate Change, and Environment	Dr. Maina Talia	Vaitupu	
Minister for Transport, Energy, Communication, and Innovation	Simon Kofe	Funafuti	
Minister for Natural Resources Development	Sa'aga Talu Teafa	Niutao	
Minister for Health and Social Welfare	Tuafafa Latasi	Funafuti	
Minister for Education and Human Resources Development	Hamoa Holona	Nanumaga	
Minister of Public Works, Infrastructure and Water	Ampelosa Manoa Tehulu	Nanumea	

== Natano Cabinet (2019-2024) ==
Following the 2019 Tuvaluan general election, on 19 September 2019, the members of parliament elected Kausea Natano from Funafuti as Prime Minister, and Samuelu Teo was elected as Speaker of the Parliament of Tuvalu.

Mrs. Teniku Talesi Honolulu, the acting Governor-General of Tuvalu convened the Parliament of Tuvalu to meet on 19 September 2019, at which Kausea Natano was elected as Prime Minister of Tuvalu. Natano appointed the members of the Cabinet, which met for the first time on 20 September 2019.

Portfolio	Minister	Constituency	Notes
Prime Minister	Kausea Natano	Funafuti	
Deputy Prime Minister & Minister of Fisheries & Trade	Minute Alapati Taupo	Nanumaga	Died 23 May 2022.
Deputy Prime Minister & Minister of Fisheries & Trade	Kitiona Tausi	Nanumaga	Elected in the by-election held on 15 July 2022 and then appointed to the cabinet.
Minister for Justice, Communication & Foreign Affairs	Simon Kofe	Funafuti	Kofe resigned from his role as a minister in July 2023 to focus on the parliamentary work to amend the Constitution.
Minister for Justice, Communication & Foreign Affairs	Panapasi Nelesoni	Nukufetau	Appointed in August 2023.
Minister for Education, Youth & Sports	Timi Melei	Nanumea	
Minister for Public Utilities & Environment	Ampelosa Manoa Tehulu	Nanumea	
Minister of Finance	Seve Paeniu	Nukulaelae	
Minister for Health, Social Welfare & Gender	Isaia Taape	Vaitupu	
Minister for Local Government & Agriculture	Katepu Laoi	Niutao	Died on 8 April 2022.
Minister for Local Government & Agriculture	Sa'aga Talu Teafa	Niutao	Won the Niutao by-election on 6 June 2022 following the death of Katepu Laoi.
Minister for Transport, Energy & Tourism	Nielu Meisake	Vaitupu	

== Sopoaga Cabinet (2013-2019) ==
On 1 August 2013, Governor-General of Tuvalu Sir Iakoba Italeli made an unprecedented use of his reserve powers in removing prime minister Willy Telavi from office and appointed opposition leader Enele Sopoaga as interim prime minister. On 4 August 2013, Sopoaga was elected as prime minister by 8 votes to 5. He was sworn in and appointed his ministers to the cabinet a day later.

The 2015 Tuvaluan general election was held on 31 March. Vete Sakaio, the deputy prime minister and minister for public utilities, was not re-elected to parliament.

Enele Sopoaga was sworn in as prime minister and appointed the ministers to the cabinet on 10 April.

Portfolio	Minister	Term	
Portfolio	Minister	Start	End
Prime Minister	Enele Sopoaga	5 August 2013	19 September 2019
Deputy Prime Minister	Vete Sakaio	5 August 2013	10 April 2015
Deputy Prime Minister	Maatia Toafa	10 April 2015	19 September 2019
Minister of Communications and Transport	Monise Laafai	5 August 2013	19 September 2019
Minister of Education, Youth, and Sport	Fauoa Maani	10 April 2015	19 September 2019
Minister of Education, Youth, Sport, and Health	Fauoa Maani	5 August 2013	10 April 2015
Minister of Environment, Foreign Affairs, Labour, and Trade	Taukelina Finikaso	5 August 2013	19 September 2019
Minister of Finance and Economic Development	Maatia Toafa	5 August 2013	19 September 2019
Minister of Health	Satini Manuella	10 April 2015	19 September 2019
Minister of Home Affairs	Namoliki Sualiki	5 August 2013	19 September 2019
Minister of Public Utilities	Vete Sakaio	5 August 2013	10 April 2015
Minister of Public Utilities	Enele Sopoaga	10 April 2015	19 September 2019
Minister of Works and Natural Resources	Elisala Pita	5 August 2013	22 August 2016
Minister of Works and Natural Resources	Puakena Boreham	August 2016	19 September 2019

== Cabinets 2010-2013 ==
=== Telavi Cabinet (2010–2013) ===
The government led by Maatia Toafa remained in office for 3 months. In December 2010, Willy Telavi, minister for home affairs in the Toafa Ministry, crossed the floor, joined the opposition and enabled it to bring down the Toafa's government through a vote of no confidence, which was carried by eight votes to seven. On 24 December, Telavi was elected as the Prime Minister, defeating Environment Minister Enele Sopoaga (who was supported by Maatia Toafa) by another 8–7 vote. Telavi appointed his cabinet on that same day, Christmas Eve.

Portfolio	Minister	Constituency	Notes
Prime Minister	Willy Telavi	Nanumea	Held office of Minister for Home Affairs from December 2010 to July 2011.
Prime Minister	Willy Telavi	Nanumea	Held office of Minister for Works and Natural Resources from July 2011 to August 2013.
Deputy Prime Minister	Kausea Natano	Funafuti	Office held alongside Minister for Communications, Transport and Public Utilities
Minister for Communications, Transport and Public Utilities	Kausea Natano	Funafuti	Office held alongside Deputy Prime Minister.
Minister for Education, Youth and Sport	Dr. Falesa Pitoi	Nanumaga	Office held from December 2012 until unable to act due to illness.
Minister for the Environment, Foreign Affairs, Labour, Trade and Tourism	Apisai Ielemia	Vaitupu	Tourism portfolio no longer appeared in a later list.
Minister for Finance	Lotoala Metia	Nukufetau	Office held from December 2010 until death in December 2012.
Minister for Finance	Vacant		No successor announced following death of incumbent in December 2012.
Minister for Health	Taom Tanukale	Nui	Office held from December 2010 to July 2013.
Minister for Health	Vacant		No successor announced following resignation of incumbent in July 2013.
Minister for Works and Natural Resources	Isaia Italeli	Nui	Office held from July 2011 until death.
Minister for Works and Natural Resources	Willy Telavi	Nanumea	Office held from July 2011 to August 2013.
Minister for Home Affairs	Willy Telavi	Nanumea	Office held from December 2010 to July 2011.
Minister for Home Affairs	Pelenike Isaia	Nui	Office held from July 2011 to August 2013.

Isaia Italeli, minister for works and natural resources, died suddenly on 19 July 2011, while attending a regional meeting in Apia, Samoa. In August, his widow, Pelenike Isaia, was elected to his seat in parliament in a by-election in the constituency of Nui, thereby saving the government's parliamentary majority. She was subsequently appointed to cabinet as minister for home affairs. She is the second woman in parliament, and in cabinet, in Tuvalu's history.

On 21 December 2012, finance minister Lotoala Metia died in hospital, of unspecified causes. The by-election caused by his death would decide the future of the Telavi government, reduced by his death (once again) to a parity of seven seats apiece with the opposition in parliament. The government succeeded in postponing it until 28 June, whereupon it was won by the opposition candidate Elisala Pita, with two-thirds of the vote.

On 30 July 2013, as the government was about to face a motion of no confidence, health minister Taom Tanukale unexpectedly resigned from Parliament (and thus also from the government) altogether. As a consequence of the death of Metia, education minister Falesa Pitoi being ill and outside the country since December 2012, and Tanukale having resigned, Telavi was left with only three active government ministers other than himself: deputy prime minister Kausea Natano, foreign affairs minister Apisai Ielemia, and home affairs minister Pelenike Isaia; he also had the support of the speaker. (There were no government backbenchers.) The following day, the reason for Tanukale's resignation became apparent. The speaker, Sir Kamuta Latasi, rejected the opposition's attempt to table a motion of no confidence, on the grounds that there was now a vacant seat in parliament. Latasi adjourned parliament, and ruled that it would not reconvene until a by-election had been held - thus prolonging Telavi's minority government once more. However, a day later on 1 August 2013, the governor-general and head of state, Sir Iakoba Italeli, sent out a proclamation removing Telavi from office as prime minister, and appointing opposition leader Enele Sopoaga as interim prime minister. Telavi had reportedly announced his intention of removing Italeli as governor-general. Opposition spokesman Taukelina Finikaso praised Italeli for having "uph[e]ld the constitution", since Telavi had lacked a parliamentary majority with which to govern.

His cabinet lasted officially until 2 August 2013, when it was formally voted out of office by the opposition.

=== 2nd Toafa Cabinet (2010) ===
This short-lived cabinet was appointed by prime minister Maatia Toafa on 29 September 2010, following the general election on 16 September. It included a number of first time MPs, who had supported Toafa in his bid for the premiership. Sopoaga's appointment as minister for foreign affairs was described as a clear sign of the importance the government placed on climate change issues within its foreign policy.

Portfolio	Minister	Constituency	Notes
Prime Minister	Maatia Toafa	Nanumea	Was previously Prime Minister from 2004 to 2006
Deputy Prime Minister, Minister of Foreign Affairs, the Environment and Labour	Enele Sopoaga	Nukufetau	First time MP; Diplomat; renowned as Tuvalu's "climate change negotiator"
Minister of Education, Youth and Sport	Namoliki Sualiki	Nukulaelae	Former teacher
Minister of Finance	Monise Laafai	Nanumaga	First time MP; Businessman
Minister of Health	Fauoa Maani	Niutao	First time MP; Former journalist and clerk to Parliament
Minister of Works and Natural resources	Vete Sakaio	Niutao	First time MP; Civil engineer
Minister of Communication, Transport and Fisheries	Taukelina Finikaso	Vaitupu	Former Minister of Communication, Transport and Tourism
Minister of Home Affairs	Willy Telavi	Nanumea	Former Minister of Home Affairs and Rural Development

== Cabinet 2006-2010 ==
=== Ielemia Cabinet (2006–2010) ===
Following the 2006 general election Apisai Ielemia was elected as prime minister. His cabinet consisted of the following members: Ielemia continued as prime minister until the 2010 Tuvaluan general election.

Portfolio	Minister	Constituency	Notes
Prime Minister; Foreign Minister	Apisai Ielemia	Vaitupu	
Deputy Prime Minister; Minister for Natural Resources and the Environment	Tavau Teii	Niutao	
Minister for Communications	Taukelina Finikaso	Vaitupu	Initially appointed Minister of Communications and Works.
Minister for Communications	Taukelina Finikaso	Vaitupu	Subsequently, appointed Minister for Communications, Transport and Tourism.
Minister for Education, Sports and Health	Iakoba Italeli	Nui	
Minister for Finance and Economic Planning	Lotoala Metia	Nukufetau	
Minister for Home Affairs and Rural Development	Willy Telavi	Nanumea	
Minister for Public Utilities and Industries	Kausea Natano	Funafuti	

== Cabinets 2002-2006 ==
=== 1st Toafa Cabinet (2004–2006) ===
Maatia Toafa succeeded Saufatu Sopoanga as prime minister. Sopoanga resigned from parliament on 27 August 2004, after his government was deposed in a vote of no confidence. Toafa, who was deputy prime minister at the time, became acting prime minister. A by-election was held on 7 October 2004 and Saufatu Sopoanga regained his seat. Maatia Toafa was elected prime minister on 11 October 2004 with a vote of 8:7. Toafa remained prime minister until the 2006 Tuvaluan general election. The members of cabinet included:

Portfolio	Minister	Constituency	Notes
Prime Minister and Minister of Foreign Affairs	Maatia Toafa	Nanumea	
Deputy Prime Minister, Minister for Works, Transport and Communication	Saufatu Sopoanga	Nukufetau	
Minister for Finance	Bikenibeu Paeniu	Nukulaelae	

=== Sopoanga Cabinet (2002–2004) ===
Following the 202 general election, on 2 August 2002 Saufatu Sopoanga, who had been minister of finance in the previous administration, was elected prime minister. The deputy prime minister was Maatia Toafa and Bikenibeu Paeniu was the minister of finance. Sopoanga resigned from parliament on 27 August 2004, after his government was deposed in a vote of no confidence.

The members of the cabinet were:

Portfolio	Minister	Constituency	Notes
Prime Minister and Minister of Foreign Affairs	Saufatu Sopoanga	Nukufetau	
Deputy Prime Minister, Minister for Works, Energy and Communications	Maatia Toafa	Nanumea	
Minister for Finance and Economic Planning	Bikenibeu Paeniu	Nukulaelae	
Minister for Natural Resources and Land	Samuelu Teo	Niutao	
Minister for Health Education and Sport	Alesana Seluka	Nui	
Home Affairs and Rural Development	Otinielu Tausi	Nanumaga	

== Cabinets 1998-2002 ==
=== Talake Cabinet (2001–2002) ===
Koloa Talake became prime minister on 14 December 2001, after his predecessor Faimalaga Luka had been ousted by parliament in a motion of no confidence. This was Talake's cabinet just prior to the July 2002 general election, in which Talake lost his seat in parliament:

Portfolio	Minister	Constituency	Notes
Prime Minister and Minister of Foreign Affairs	Koloa Talake	Vaitupu	
Minister for Finance and Economic Planning	Saufatu Sopoanga	Nukufetau	
Minister for Health, Education and Sports	Alesana Seluka	Nui	
Minister for Internal Affairs and Local Government	Otinielu Tausi	Nanumaga	
Minister for Natural Resources	Samuelu Teo	Niutao	
Minister for Works, Energy and Communications	Kokea Malua	Nanumea	

=== Luka Cabinet (2001) ===
Faimalaga Luka became the prime minister on 24 February 2001 until he was replaced by Koloa Talake after a vote of no confidence on 14 December 2001.

Cabinet to be added

=== Tuilimu Cabinet (2000-2001) ===
Lagitupu Tuilimu was acting prime minister from 8 December 2000 to 24 February 2001. he was appointed following the death of Ionatana Ionatana on 8 December 2000. The members of the cabinet were:

Portfolio	Minister	Constituency	Notes
Prime Minister (acting)	Lagitupu Tuilimu	Nanumea	also Minister for Finance and Economic Planning
Minister for Education, Sports & Culture	Amasone Kilei	Nui	also Minister for Health
Minister for Local Government, Women and Youth	Faimalaga Luka	Nukufetau	
Minister for Natural Resources	Namoto Kelisiano	Nanumaga	
Minister for Works, Communications and Transport	Teagai Esekia	Vaitupu	

=== Ionatana Cabinet (1999-2000) ===
Ionatana Ionatana was elected as prime minister following the resignation of Bikenibeu Paeniu following a vote of no confidence on 27 April 1999. Ionatana Ionatana died on 8 December 2000. Lagitupu Tuilimu was appointed the minister of finance (1999–2001).

Cabinet to be added

=== 3rd Paeniu Cabinet (1998-1999) ===
Following the 1998 general election, Bikenibeu Paeniu was re-elected prime minister on 8 April 1998; He appointed his cabinet on the same day. Bikenibeu Paeniu remained as prime minister until he resigned following a vote of no confidence on 27 April 1999.

Portfolio	Minister	Constituency	Notes
Prime Minister and Minister of Foreign Affairs	Bikenibeu Paeniu	Nukulaelae	
Minister for Finance and Economic Planning	Alesana Seluka	Nui	also Minister for Tourism, Trade and Commerce
Minister for Health, Women and Community Affairs	Ionatana Ionatana	Funafuti	also Minister for Education and Culture
Minister for Internal Affairs and Local Government	Kokea Malua	Nanumea	also Deputy Prime Minister
Minister for Natural Resources	Kokea Malua	Nanumea	
Minister for Works, Energy and Communications	Otinielu Tausi	Nanumaga	

== Cabinets 1993-1998 ==
=== 2nd Paeniu Cabinet (1996-1998) ===
Bikenibeu Paeniu was elected as prime minister for the second time following the resignation of Kamuta Latasi as the result of a vote of no confidence on 24 December 1996.

Portfolio	Minister	Constituency	Notes
Prime Minister and Minister of Foreign Affairs	Bikenibeu Paeniu	Nukulaelae	
Minister for Finance and Economic Planning	Alesana Seluka	Nui	
Minister for Health, Women and Community Affairs	Ionatana Ionatana	Funafuti	also Minister for Education and Culture
Minister for Tourism, Trade and Commerce	Ionatana Ionatana	Funafuti	
Minister for Natural Resources	Otinielu Tausi	Nanumaga	also Deputy Prime Minister.
Home Affairs and Rural Development	Otinielu Tausi	Nanumaga	

=== Latasi Cabinet (1993-1996) ===
The general election was held on 2 September 1993. In the subsequent parliament the members were evenly split in their support of the incumbent prime minister Bikenibeu Paeniu and the former prime minister Tomasi Puapua.

As a consequence, the governor-general, Sir Toaripi Lauti, dissolved the parliament on 22 September and a further election took place on 25 November 1993. The subsequent parliament elected Kamuta Latasi as prime minister on 10 December 1993, with a 7:5 majority over the group a members of parliament headed by former prime minister Bikenibeu Paeniu. The deputy prime minister was Otinielu Tausi. Alesana Seluka was appointed the minister of finance (1996–1999) Kamuta Latasi ceased to be the prime minister as the result of a vote of no confidence on 24 December 1996. The members of the cabinet included:

Portfolio	Minister	Constituency	Notes
Prime Minister and Minister of Foreign Affairs	Kamuta Latasi	Funafuti	
Deputy Prime Minister	Otinielu Tausi	Nanumanga	
Minister for Finance	Alesana Seluka	Nui	

== Cabinets 1977-1993 ==
=== 1st Paeniu Cabinet (1989-1993) ===
Following the 1989 general election Bikenibeu Paeniu was subsequently elected as prime minister, with a five-member cabinet formed on 16 October 1989. The members of the cabinet were:

Portfolio	Minister	Constituency	Notes
Prime Minister, Foreign Affairs and Economic Planning	Bikenibeu Paeniu	Nukulaelae	
Deputy Prime Minister, Minister for Finance	Alesana Seluka	Nui	
Minister for Works and Communications	Ionatana Ionatana	Funafuti	
Minister of Natural Resources and Home Affairs	Tomu Sione	Niutao	
Minister of Health, Education and Community Affairs	Naama Maheu Latasi	Nanumea	

=== 2nd Puapua Cabinet (1985-1989) ===
The general election was held on 12 September 1985, with nine members re-elected including prime minister Tomasi Puapua and finance minister Henry Naisali. On 21 September, Tomasi Puapua was re-elected as prime minister; he subsequently appointed a five-member cabinet. Henry Naisali resigned his seat to take up the position of Secretary General of the South Pacific Forum in September 1988. Kitiseni Lopati, was appointed as the minister of finance and commerce to replace Naisali. The members of the cabinet were:

Portfolio	Minister	Constituency	Notes
Prime Minister, Foreign Affairs and Local Government Minister	Dr. Tomasi Puapua	Vaitupu	
Deputy Prime Minister, Minister for Finance	Henry Naisali	Nukulaelae	Resigned in September 1988
Minister for Finance	Kitiseni Lopati	Nanumea	Appointed in September 1988
Minister of Natural Resources and Commerce	Kitiseni Lopati	Nanumea	September 1985 to September 1988
Minister of Natural Resources and Commerce	Lale Seluka	Nui	Appointed in September 1988
Minister for Works and Communications	Solomona Metia Tealofi	Nukufetau	
Minister of Social Services	Televa Tevasa	Nukulaelae	Died October 1988

=== 1st Puapua Cabinet (1981-1985) ===
The first elections after independence were not held until 8 September 1981. Dr. Tomasi Puapua, was elected as prime minister with a 7:5 majority over the group a members of parliament headed by former prime minister Toaripi Lauti. Henry Naisali, former civil servant, was appointed to cabinet as minister of finance and commerce. The members of the cabinet were:

Portfolio	Minister	Constituency	Notes
Prime Minister, Foreign Affairs and Local Government Minister	Dr. Tomasi Puapua	Vaitupu	
Deputy Prime Minister, Minister for Finance and Commerce	Henry Naisali	Nukulaelae	
Minister for Works and Communications	Solomona Metia Tealofi	Nukufetau	
Minister of Commerce and Natural Resources	Lale Seluka	Nui	
Minister of Social Services	Falaile Pilitati	Nanumea	

=== Lauti Cabinet (1977-1981) ===
Following the result of the 1974 Ellice Islands self-determination referendum, the Tuvaluan Order 1975, which took effect on 1 October 1975, recognised Tuvalu as a separate British dependency with its own government.

Elections to the House of Assembly of the British Colony of Tuvalu were held on 27 August 1977; with Toaripi Lauti being appointed Chief Minister in the House of Assembly of the Colony of Tuvalu on 1 October 1977. The House of Assembly was dissolved in July 1978 with the government of Toaripi Lauti continuing as a caretaker government until the 1981 elections were held. Toaripi Lauti became the first prime minister of the Parliament of Tuvalu or Palamene o Tuvalu on 1 October 1978 when Tuvalu became an independent nation.

The members of the cabinet were:

Portfolio	Minister	Constituency	Notes
Prime Minister and Foreign Affairs	Toaripi Lauti	Funafuti	also Minister for Finance and Commerce
Minister for Works and Communications	Maheu Naniseni	Nanumea	
Minister of Commerce and Natural Resources	Tomu Sione	Niutao	
Minister of Social Services	Taui Finikaso	Vaitupu	
