= List of heads of state of Tuvalu =

This is a list of the heads of state of Tuvalu, from the independence of Tuvalu in 1978 to the present day.

The Monarchy of Tuvalu exists in a framework of a parliamentary representative democracy. As a constitutional monarch, the King of Tuvalu, Charles III, acts entirely on the advice of his government ministers in Tuvalu. The Head of State is recognised in section 50 of the Constitution of Tuvalu, as a symbol of the unity and identity of Tuvalu. The powers of the head of state are set out in section 52 (1) of the Constitution.

Part IV of the Constitution confirms the head of state of Tuvalu is King Charles III as the sovereign of Tuvalu and provides for the rules for succession to the Crown. As set out in section 54 of the Constitution, the Queen’s representative in Tuvalu by a Governor-General. Section 58 of the Constitution requires the governor-general to perform the functions of the head of state when the sovereign is outside Tuvalu or otherwise incapacitated. The Governor-General of Tuvalu is appointed by the monarch upon the advice of the Prime Minister of Tuvalu.

The position is largely ceremonial. However the holder has constitutional responsibilities and reserve powers in relation to the ordering parliament to convene and the appointment and dismissal of the prime minister. In 2003 the Chief Justice of the High Court of Tuvalu delivered directions as to how the Governor-General should proceed to take any action he considers to be appropriate under Section 116(1) of the Constitution, acting in his own deliberate judgment, rather than as advised by the cabinet. That is, the Governor-General could consider whether it was appropriate to exercise his reserve powers in calling parliament.

== Monarch (1978–present) ==
The monarch of the United Kingdom has been the Sovereign of Tuvalu since Tuvaluan independence in 1978. The line of succession to the Tuvaluan throne is the same as that of the thrones of other Commonwealth realms.

№	Monarch (Birth–Death)	Portrait	Reign		Royal House	Prime Minister
№	Monarch (Birth–Death)	Portrait	Reign start	Reign end	Royal House	Prime Minister
1	Queen Elizabeth II (1926–2022)		1 October 1978	8 September 2022	Windsor	Lauti, Puapua, Paeniu, Latasi, Paeniu, Ionatana, Tuilimu (Interim), Luka, Talake, Sopoanga, Toafa, Ielemia, Toafa, Telavi, Sopoaga, Natano
2	King Charles III (1948–)		8 September 2022	Incumbent	Windsor	Natano, Teo

=== Governor-General ===
The Governor-General is the representative of the Monarch in Tuvalu and exercises most of the powers of the Monarch. The Governor-General is appointed for an indefinite term, serving at the pleasure of the Monarch. The Governor-General is appointed solely on the advice of the Cabinet of Tuvalu without the involvement of the British government. In the event of a vacancy the Speaker serves as Officer Administering the Government.

Following is a list of people who have served as Governor-General of Tuvalu since independence in 1978.

Denotes Acting Governors-General

No.	Portrait	Name (Birth–Death)	Term of office			Monarch (Reign)
No.	Portrait	Name (Birth–Death)	Took office	Left office	Time in office	Monarch (Reign)
1		Sir Fiatau Penitala Teo (1911–1998)	1 October 1978	1 March 1986	7 years, 151 days	Elizabeth II (1978–2022)
2		Sir Tupua Leupena (1922–1996)	1 March 1986	1 October 1990	4 years, 214 days	Elizabeth II (1978–2022)
3		Sir Toaripi Lauti (1928–2014)	1 October 1990	1 December 1993	3 years, 61 days	Elizabeth II (1978–2022)
4		Sir Tomu Sione (1941–2016)	1 December 1993	21 June 1994	202 days	Elizabeth II (1978–2022)
5		Sir Tulaga Manuella (b. 1936)	21 June 1994	26 June 1998	4 years, 5 days	Elizabeth II (1978–2022)
6		Sir Tomasi Puapua (b. 1938)	26 June 1998	9 September 2003	15 years, 75 days	Elizabeth II (1978–2022)
7		Faimalaga Luka (1940–2005)	9 September 2003	15 April 2005	1 year, 218 days	Elizabeth II (1978–2022)
8		Sir Filoimea Telito (1945–2011)	15 April 2005	19 March 2010	4 years, 338 days	Elizabeth II (1978–2022)
–		Sir Kamuta Latasi (b. 1936); Acting Governor-General	19 March 2010	16 April 2010	28 days	Elizabeth II (1978–2022)
9		Sir Iakoba Italeli (b. ?)	16 April 2010	22 August 2019	9 years, 128 days	Elizabeth II (1978–2022)
–		Teniku Talesi Honolulu (b. ?); Acting Governor-General	22 August 2019	January; 2021	–	Elizabeth II (1978–2022)
–		Samuelu Teo (b. ?); Acting Governor-General	January; 2021	28 September 2021	–	Elizabeth II (1978–2022)
10		Tofiga Vaevalu Falani (b. ?)	29 September 2021	Incumbent	4 years, 337 days	Charles III (2022–present)

== Standards ==
Governor-General's Standard
