= List of Tuvaluans =

This is a list of notable people from Tuvalu.

- Eselealofa Apinelu
- Opetaia Foa'i
- Apisai Ielemia
- Ionatana Ionatana
- Kamuta Latasi
- Toaripi Lauti
- Tupua Leupena
- Faimalaga Luka
- Tulaga Manuella
- Bikenibeu Paeniu
- Seve Paeniu
- Tomasi Puapua
- Tomu Sione
- Saufatu Sopoanga
- Koloa Talake
- Filoimea Telito
- Fiatau Penitala Teo
- Maatia Toafa
- Lagitupu Tuilimu
- Solofa Uota
