= September 1993 Tuvaluan general election =

← 1989	2 September 1993	November 1993 →

All 12 seats in the Parliament of Tuvalu
	First party
Party	Independents
Seats won	12
Prime Minister before election
Bikenibeu Paeniu
Subsequent
Prime Minister
Bikenibeu Paeniu (caretaker)

General elections were held in Tuvalu on 2 September 1993. As there were no political parties, all candidates for the twelve seats ran as independents. Prime Minister Bikenibeu Paeniu was re-elected, along with all members of his cabinet, except Naama Latasi. However, supporters of Paeniu held six seats while supporters of the previous Prime Minister Tomasi Puapua (Otinielu Tausi, Koloa Talake, Faimalaga Luka, Vave Founuku and Vavae Katalake) held the other six.

In order to break the impasse, the Governor-General dissolved Parliament on 22 September and fresh elections were held in November.

== Results ==
Party	Seats	+/–
Independents	12	0
Total	12	0
Source: Nohlen et al.
