= 1989 Tuvaluan general election =

- 27 September 1989

All 12 seats in the Parliament of Tuvalu
	First party
Party	Independents
Seats won	12
Prime Minister before election
Tomasi Puapua
Subsequent
Prime Minister
Bikenibeu Paeniu

General elections were held in Tuvalu on 27 September 1989. Bikenibeu Paeniu was elected prime minister following the elections and formed a five-member cabinet composed largely of opponents of the previous prime minister Tomasi Puapua.

== Campaign ==
As there were no political parties, all candidates for the twelve seats ran as independents. The Nui constituency was contested by four members of the same family. Bikenibeu Paeniu was the only candidate in Nukulaelae and was elected unopposed.

== Results ==
For the first time, a woman was elected, with Naama Maheu Latasi winning one of the seats on Nanumea. Her husband Kamuta Latasi was elected in Funafuti. In Nui Minister for Commerce and Natural Resources Lale Seluka was defeated by his brother Alesana Seluka.

Party	Seats	+/–
Independents	12	0
Total	12	0
Source: Nohlen et al.

=== Elected members ===
Constituency	Member
Funafuti	Ionatana Ionatana
Funafuti	Kamuta Latasi
Nanumanga	Otinielu Tausi
Nanumea	Kokea Malua
Nanumea	Naama Maheu Latasi
Niutao	Vave Founuku
Niutao	Tomu Sione
Nui	Alesana Seluka
Nukufetau	Solomona Metia Tealofi
Nukulaelae	Bikenibeu Paeniu
Vaitupu	Tomasi Puapua
Vaitupu	Iuta Tanielu
Source: PIM

== Aftermath ==
Following the elections Kokea Malua was elected Speaker and Bikenibeu Paeniu elected prime minister. Paeniu subsequently formed a five-member cabinet, keeping the Foreign Affairs and Economic Planning portfolios for himself. Alesana Seluka became deputy prime minister and Minister of Finance and Commerce, Naama Maheu Latasi was appointed Minister of Health, Education and Community Affairs, Ionatana Ionatana as Minister of Works and Communications and Tomu Sione as Minister of Natural Resources and Home Affairs.
