= 1998 Tuvaluan general election =

- 26 March 1998

All 12 seats in the Parliament of Tuvalu
	First party
Party	Independents
Seats before	12
Prime Minister before election
Bikenibeu Paeniu
Subsequent
Prime Minister
Bikenibeu Paeniu

General elections were held in Tuvalu on 26 March 1998.

All candidates for the 12 seats ran as independents. With no formal political parties, the political system was based on personal alliances and loyalties derived from clan and family connections.

Seven of the incumbents retained their seats. Following the election Bikenibeu Paeniu was re-elected Prime Minister.

== Background ==
On 18 December 1997 parliament was dissolved. During the election campaign, candidates from the incumbent government and the opposition traded allegations of sexual and financial misconduct.

== Results ==
Seven incumbent members were re-elected, including Bikenibeu Paeniu, Otinielu Tausi, Ionatana Ionatana, Tomasi Puapua and Alesana Seluka, and opposition MPs Koloa Talake and Faimalaga Luka. Two members of previous parliaments were elected, including Kokea Malua of Nanumea, while three members were new to parliament; Lagitupu Tuilimu of Nanumea, Teleke Peleti Lauti of Funafuti and Samuelu Teo of Niutao. Former prime minister Kamuta Latasi, who represented Funafuti, lost his seat.

Constituency	Members	Notes
Funafuti	Ionatana Ionatana	Died on 8 December 2000
Funafuti	Teleke Peleti Lauti	
Nanumaga	Otinielu Tausi	
Nanumea	Kokea Malua	
Nanumea	Lagitupu Tuilimu	
Niutao	Samuelu Teo	
Niutao	Tomu Sione	
Nui	Alesana Seluka	
Nukufetau	Faimalaga Luka	
Nukulaelae	Bikenibeu Paeniu	
Vaitupu	Koloa Talake	
Vaitupu	Tomasi Puapua	

== Aftermath ==
Paeniu was re-elected Prime Minister on 8 April, defeating Koloa Talake by a vote of 10–2. He subsequently announced the formation of a cabinet consisting of Ionatana Ionatana as Minister for Health, Women and Community Affairs and Minister for Education and Culture, Alesana Kleis Seluka as Minister for Tourism, Trade and Commerce and Minister Finance and Economic Planning, Otinielu Tausi as Minister of Works, Energy and Communications and Kokea Malua as Minister for Natural Resources and the Environment, Minister of Home Affairs and Rural Development and deputy prime minister. Tomu Sione was appointed as Speaker.

Paeniu later resigned following a motion of no confidence on 27 April 1999. Ionatana was subsequently elected prime minister on 27 April. He died on 8 December 2000. Lagitupu Tuilimu was acting prime minister from 8 December 2000 to 24 February 2001, with Faimalaga Luka becoming prime minister on 23 February 2001. Luka's government lasted until December the same year, when he lost office as the consequence of another motion of no confidence. On 13 December the former Minister of Finance Koloa Talake was appointed prime minister.
