= Elia Tavita =

Tuvaluan politician

Elia Tavita MP

Speaker of the Parliament of Tuvalu
- In office 1978–1981
- Prime Minister: Toaripi Lauti
- Preceded by: Tupua Leupena

Member of the Tuvaluan Parliament for Funafuti
- In office 1977–1998

Personal details
- Party: Independent

Elia Tavita was a Tuvaluan politician who served as Speaker of Parliament from 1978 to 1981.

Tavita was elected in the 1977 general election to represent the electorate of Funafuti in the House of Assembly of the Gilbert and Ellice colony. After Tuvalu became independent in October 1978, he represented Funafuti in the Parliament of Tuvalu.

Toaripi Lauti was elected as the Chief Minister of the House of Assembly, on 1 October 1977, and as the Prime Minister of Tuvalu following independence. The parliament was dissolved in July 1978 with the government of Toaripi Lauti continuing as a caretaker government. until the 1981 elections were held. Tavita was returned to parliament in the 1981 general election, and was succeeded by Vave Founuku as the speaker of the parliament. However, he was not re-elected in the 1998 general election. He was a candidate in the 2002 general election but was not elected.
