= Vave Founuku =

Tuvaluan politician (born 1928)

Vave Founuku MP
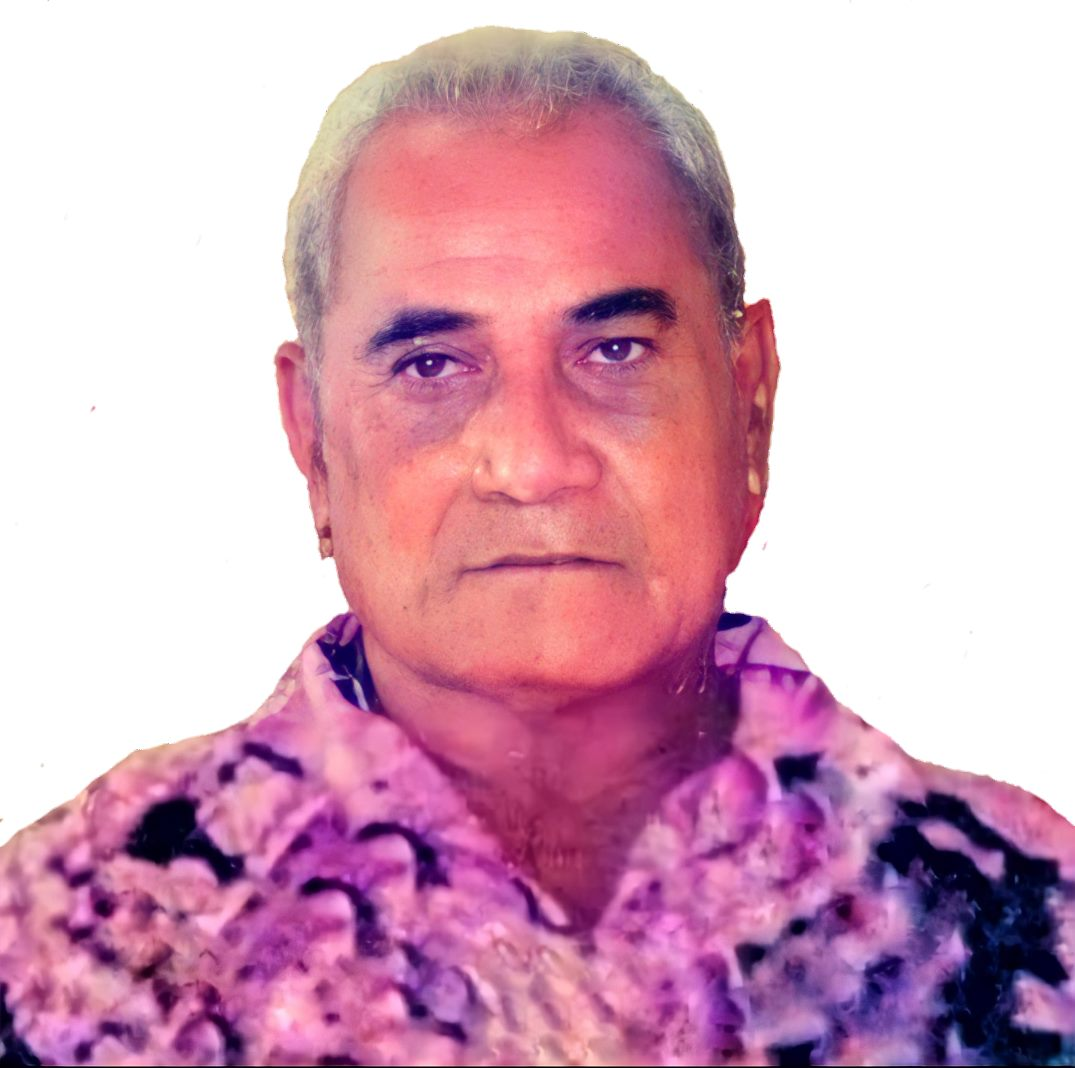

Speaker of the Parliament of Tuvalu
- In office 1981–1989
- Prime Minister: Tomasi Puapua
- Preceded by: Elia Tavita

Member of the Tuvaluan Parliament for Niutao
- In office 1981–1998

Personal details
- Born: 20 June 1928 Tuvalu
- Party: Independent
- Spouse: Silaumei Esekia
- Children: Viena, Fatulolo, Eleni, Iapesa, Takiao, Uatea, Kapikea
- Parent(s): Founuku; Viena Te-paolo

Vave V. Founuku (born 20 June 1928) was a Tuvaluan politician who served as Speaker of Parliament from 1981 to 1989.

Founuku represented Niutao. Founuku was elected to represent the Niutao electorate in the 1981 general election. He was re-elected in the 1989 general election. He was re-elected in the first 1993 general election and also in the second 1993 general election. Following the 1998 general election he was succeeded by Samuelu Teo.

== Commonwealth honours ==
In 1997 he was made an Ordinary Officer of the Civil Division of the said Most Excellent Order of the British Empire for community, public and political servcices.
