= List of ambassadors of Tuvalu to Taiwan =

Diplomats leading the Tuvaluan mission to Taiwan

Coordinates: 25.034374°N 121.561016°E

Ambassador of Tuvalu to Taiwan
- Incumbent; Bikenibeu Paeniu since June 1, 2022
- Inaugural holder: Enele Sopoaga
- Formation: June 1, 1997

The Tuvaluan ambassador to Taiwan is the official representative of the Government in Funafuti to the Government of the Taiwan.

== List of representatives ==
Diplomatic agrément/Diplomatic accreditation	Ambassador	Chinese language	Observations	Prime Minister of Tuvalu	Term end
September 19, 1979			Formal diplomatic relations with Taiwan	Toaripi Lauti	
June 1, 1997	Enele Sopoaga	埃內爾·索本嘉	non resident ambassador, with residence in Suva as High Commissioner to Fiji	Bikenibeu Paeniu	
February 1, 2013	Minute Alapati Taupo	陶波		Willy Telavi	March 1, 2017
March 1, 2017	Limasene Teatu	凃莉梅		Enele Sopoaga	May, 2022
June 1, 2022	Bikenibeu Paeniu	潘恩紐		Kausea Natano	Present
