= 1977 Tuvaluan general election =

General elections in Tuvalu

- 27 August 1977

All 12 seats in the House of Assembly
	First party
Party	Independents
Seats won	12
Chief Minister before election
Toaripi Lauti
Subsequent
Prime Minister
Toaripi Lauti

General elections were held in Tuvalu on 27 August 1977. As there were no political parties, all candidates ran as independents, with Toaripi Lauti who had served as chief minister of the Colony of Tuvalu (1975–1978), was elected as the first prime minister following Tuvalu's independence. Voter turnout was 79%.

== Background ==
Following a 1974 referendum, the Ellice Islands separated from the Gilbert and Ellice Islands. The Tuvaluan Order 1975, which took effect on 1 October 1975, recognised Tuvalu as a separate British dependency with its own government. The second stage occurred on 1 January 1976 when separate administrations were created out of the civil service of the Gilbert and Ellice Islands.

A new House of Assembly was established with eight members. Prior to the 1977 elections, the number was increased to twelve. The four islands with a population of over 1,000 elected two members and the other four islands elected one member.

== Results ==
Minister Isakaia Paeniu lost his seat.

Party	Votes	%	Seats
Independents			12
Total			12
Total votes	2,256	–	
Registered voters/turnout	2,862	78.83	
Source: Nohlen et al.

=== Elected members ===
Constituency	Member
Funafuti	Toaripi Lauti
Funafuti	Elia Tavita
Nanumaga	
Nanumea	Motofoua Feso
Nanumea	Maheu Naniseni
Niutao	Tepepe Papua
Niutao	Tomu Sione
Nui	Sione Tui Kleis
Nukufetau	
Nukulaelae	Henry Naisali
Vaitupu	Tomasi Puapua
Vaitupu	Taui Finikaso

== Aftermath ==
Following the elections, Toaripi Lauti was elected as the Prime Minister of Tuvalu on 1 October 1977. The House of the Assembly was renamed the Parliament of Tuvalu after independence in October 1978.
