= November 1993 Tuvaluan general election =

- 25 November 1993

All 12 seats in the Parliament of Tuvalu
	First party
Party	Independents
Seats won	12
Prime Minister before election
Bikenibeu Paeniu (caretaker PM)
Subsequent
Prime Minister
Kamuta Latasi

Early general elections were held in Tuvalu on 25 November 1993, after the previous elections in September had resulted in a deadlock in Parliament, with supporters of incumbent and former Prime Ministers Bikenibeu Paeniu and Tomasi Puapua holding an equal number of seats.

As there were no political parties, all candidates for the twelve seats ran as independents. Following the elections, Puapua stepped aside and Kamuta Latasi was elected Prime Minister on 10 December, defeating Paeniu by seven votes to five. Otinielu Tausi became Deputy Prime Minister, while Tomasi Puapua was appointed Speaker.

Although Naama Latasi (the only female MP) had not re-elected in the September elections, she regained her seat in parliament in the November elections.

== Results ==
Party	Seats	+/–
Independents	12	0
Total	12	0
Source: IPU
