= Henry Naisali =

Tuvaluan politician (1928–2004)

The Honourable Henry Faati Naisali CMG AO OBE
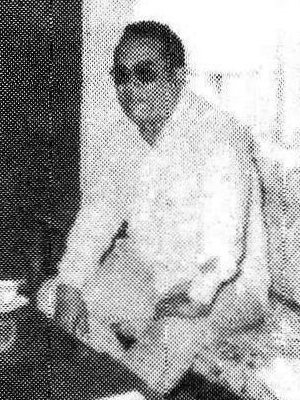
- Naisali in 1988

Director of the South Pacific Bureau for Economic Co-operation; then Secretary General of the Pacific Islands Forum.
- In office January 1986 – January 1992
- Preceded by: Mahe Tupouniua (Tonga)
- Succeeded by: Ieremia Tabai (Kiribati)

Personal details
- Born: 7 December 1928 Nukulaelae, Tuvalu
- Died: 20 October 2004 (aged 75) Auckland, New Zealand
- Spouse: Vaimaila
- Children: 4

Henry Faati Naisali (7 December 1928 – 20 October 2004) was a Tuvaluan politician who served as Deputy Prime Minister of Tuvalu (1985-1989), Secretary General of the Pacific Islands Forum (1988-1992) and Pro-Chancellor of The University of the South Pacific (1985-1990). He is notable for co-founding the Tuvalu Trust Fund which lead Tuvalu to achieve greater financial autonomy.

He attended the Elisefou School on Vaitupu, the Ratu Kadavulevu and Queen Victoria schools in Fiji, St. Andrews College in Christchurch, New Zealand, and studied at Canterbury University College, 1954-1956. He joined the Gilbert and Ellice Islands civil service in 1952. He participated in the negotiations in London which resulted in the Gilbert and Ellice Islands colony being separated into the British colonies of Kiribati and Tuvalu.

== Financial Secretary of the British Colony of Tuvalu ==
He was appointed Financial Secretary of the British Colony of Tuvalu in 1976. He was elected to represent Nukulaelae in the House of Assembly of the British Colony of Tuvalu in the 1977 Tuvaluan general election. In the 1977 elections Naisali defeated by only 14 votes Isakala Paeniu who had been a minister in the administration of the Gilbert and Ellice Islands colony.

== Finance Minister of Tuvalu ==
Tuvalu became fully independent within the Commonwealth on 1 October 1978. The first elections for the Parliament of Tuvalu were not held until 8 September 1981.

Naisali was elected to the Parliament of Tuvalu in the 1981 Tuvaluan general election and was appointed Minister of Finance and Deputy Prime Minister. He was re-elected in the 1985 Tuvaluan general election and was re-appointed finance minister and deputy prime minister in the government of prime minister Tomasi Puapua. He was appointed as the director of South Pacific Bureau for Economic Cooperation (SPEC) in 1986. In 1987, he was instrumental in the formation of the Tuvalu Trust Fund, which involving the governments of the United Kingdom, Australia and New Zealand providing the capital for a sovereign wealth fund to support the budget of the government of Tuvalu. Japan, and South Korea also contributed to the fund.

He was re-elected in the 1989 Tuvaluan general election, however he was not re-elected in the 1993 elections.

== Pacific Islands Forum ==
Naisali was the Director of the South Pacific Bureau for Economic Co-operation (SPEC) from January 1986 to September 1988; he continued as Secretary General of the Pacific Islands Forum (PIF) until January 1992, following the formation of the PIF as successor of the SPEC.

== Honours ==
Naisali was appointed a Member of the Order of the British Empire (MBE) in the 1975 Birthday Honours, a Companion of the Order of St Michael and St George (CMG) in the 1983 New Year Honours, and an Officer of the Order of Australia (AO) in February 1992, "for service to Australian/Pacific Island relations, particularly as Secretary General to the South Pacific Forum."

Political offices
Preceded by Toalipi Lauti	Minister of Finance of Tuvalu; 1981–1986	Succeeded by Kitiseni Lopati
