= 2006 Tuvaluan general election =

- 3 August 2006

All 15 seats in the Parliament of Tuvalu
	First party
Party	Independents
Seats before	15
Prime Minister before election
Maatia Toafa
Subsequent
Prime Minister
Apisai Ielemia

General elections were held in Tuvalu on 3 August 2006 to elect fifteen members to the Parliament. There were 5,765 eligible voters on the electoral roll. 32 candidates, including 2 women, competed for the 15 seats (the parliament had been increased from 12 to 15 elected members). All fifteen candidates elected were Independents, as there are no political parties in the country.

The years before the elections had involved an uncertain economic situation with questions about the political stability with frequent changes of prime minister. There had also been questions about the integrity of some government ministers.

The election saw eight of the fifteen incumbent MPs defeated, including the entire cabinet of the incumbent Prime Minister Maatia Toafa (who did retain his seat). Eight new members were elected to the parliament. The new members of parliament are predominantly experienced civil servants, including Taukelina Finikaso (former diplomat); Iakoba Italeli (former attorney general); Lotoala Metia (former auditor general); Namoliki Sualiki (former school principal); Willy Telavi (former police commissioner); and Falesa Pitoi (dentist).

Apisai Ielemia was elected the prime minister.

== Results ==
Constituency	Candidate	Votes	%	Notes
Funafuti	Kamuta Latasi	352	45.8	Re-elected
Funafuti	Kausea Natano	340	44.4	Re-elected
Funafuti	Emily Koepeke Lauti	39	5.0	
Funafuti	Iosefa Elisala	37	4.8	
Nanumaga	Falesa Pitoi	335	39.0	Elected
Nanumaga	Otinielu Tausi	300	35.0	Re-elected
Nanumaga	Halo Tuavai	222	26.0	
Nanumea	Maatia Toafa	397	28.6	Re-elected
Nanumea	Willy Telavi	422	30.5	Elected
Nanumea	Kokea Malua	298	21.5	Unseated
Nanumea	Annie Homasi	234	16.8	
Nanumea	Langitupu Tuilimu	36	2.6	
Niutao	Tomu Sione	416	33.0	Elected
Niutao	Tavau Teii	373	29.0	Re-elected
Niutao	Samuelu Teo	318	25.0	
Niutao	Iopu Iupasi Kaisala	169	13.0	
Nui	Iakoba Italeli	281	31.0	Elected
Nui	Alesana Seluka	220	24.3	Elected
Nui	Taom Tanukale	212	23.4	
Nui	Pakai Asaia	192	21.2	
Nukufetau	Lotoala Metia	507	37.5	Elected
Nukufetau	Elisala Pita	430	31.8	Elected
Nukufetau	Saufatu Sopoanga	414	30.6	
Nukulaelae	Namoliki Sualiki	109	42.1	Elected
Nukulaelae	Bikenibeu Paeniu	65	25.1	Unseated
Nukulaelae	Vaefitu Luke Paeniu	64	24.7	
Nukulaelae	Iefata Paeniu	21	8.1	
Vaitupu	Apisai Ielemia	336	34.2	Re-elected
Vaitupu	Taukelina Finikaso	247	25.2	Elected
Vaitupu	Matanile Iosefa	224	22.8	
Vaitupu	Eti Esela	173	17.6	
Vaitupu	Leti Pelesala	2	0.2	Unseated
Source: Hassall, Psephos

== Aftermath ==
On 14 August 2006 Apisai Ielemia was elected prime minister; he had previously been a diplomat, clerk to parliament and senior civil servant. Kamuta Latasi was appointed the Speaker of Parliament. The new government sworn in by Governor-General, Reverend Filoimea Telito on 14 August comprised Apisai Ielemia as Prime Minister and Minister of Foreign Affairs; Tavau Teii (Niutao) Deputy Prime Minister and Minister of Natural Resources; Willy Telavi (Nanumea) Home Affairs; Lotoala Metia (Nukufetau) Finance, Economic Planning and Industries; Kausea Natano (Funafuti) Public Utilities; Taukelina Finikaso (Vaitupu) Communications and Works; Italeli Taeia (Nui) Education, Sports and Health. Sir Tomu Sione (Niutao) acted as Chairman of the Caucus.
