= Kitiseni Lopati =

Tuvaluan politician

Kitiseni Lopati MBE

Minister of Finance
- In office September 1988 – 16 October 1989
- Prime Minister: Tomasi Puapua
- Preceded by: Henry Naisali
- Succeeded by: Alesana Seluka

Member of the Tuvaluan Parliament for Nanumea
- In office 12 September 1985 – 16 October 1989

Personal details
- Party: Independent

Kitiseni Lopati MBE was a Tuvaluan politician who served as the minister of natural resources and commerce, then as the minister of finance and commerce in the cabinet of prime minister Tomasi Puapua in his second term as prime minister of Tuvalu.

In September 1988, Lopati was appointed at the minister of finance and commerce to replace Henry Naisali after he resigned his seat to take up the position of Secretary General of the South Pacific Forum. Lopati was not returned to parliament in the 1989 Tuvaluan general election.

He had earlier served as the Secretary of the Communications and Transport Department. In the 1979 Birthday Honours he was appointed a Member of the Order of the British Empire (MBE).

== Publications ==
- Kitiseni Lopati & Panapa Panapa (1968) A Vocabulary of English, Gilbertese, Ellice Common Usage, Antebuka, Gilbert Islands: Printed by the G.I.P.C.

Political offices
Preceded by Henry Naisali	Minister of Finance of Tuvalu; 1987–1989	Succeeded by Alesana Seluka
