= Lotoala Metia =

Tuvaluan politician and footballer

Minister of Finance
- In office 24 December 2010 – 21 December 2012
- Prime Minister: Willy Telavi
- Preceded by: Monise Laafai
- Succeeded by: Maatia Toafa^{[a]}

Minister for Finance, Economic Planning and Industries
- In office 16 August 2006 – 29 September 2010
- Prime Minister: Apisai Ielemia
- Preceded by: Bikenibeu Paeniu
- Succeeded by: Monise Laafai

Member of the Tuvaluan Parliament for Nukufetau
- In office 3 August 2006 – 21 December 2012
- Preceded by: Saufatu Sopoanga
- Succeeded by: Elisala Pita

Personal details
- Party: Independent
- Spouse: Penieli Metia
- a. seat vacant from 22 December 2012 – 28 June 2013.

Lotoala Metia (died 21 December 2012) was a Tuvaluan politician and football player.

== Football career ==
He played for Korogege football club, in forward position. He was selected into the Tuvalu national football team for the 1979 South Pacific Games. Coincidentally, the team also included Kausea Natano, who would later sit with him as a fellow Cabinet minister from 2010 to 2012.

== Political career ==
He was first elected to Parliament at the 2006 general election, as MP for Nukufetau. He was then appointed Minister of Finance, Economic Planning and Industries in Prime Minister Apisai Ielemia's Cabinet.

He retained his seat in Parliament in the 2010 general election, but was not selected for Cabinet by new Prime Minister Maatia Toafa. Three months later, in December, he supported Willy Telavi's successful attempt to oust the Toafa government in a motion of no confidence. Telavi became Prime Minister, and appointed Metia to his Cabinet, as Minister of Finance.

The following month, in January 2011, a number of his constituents demanded his resignation, reportedly displeased with the fact that he had joined the Telavi government. A peaceful protest march to demand that he step down took place in Funafuti, resulting in the Telavi government declaring a state of emergency and temporarily prohibiting any gathering of ten or more people. Members of the powerful council of elders or Falekaupule from his island sought to persuade him to defect to the Opposition and help bring it to power. When this directive was not followed the Falekaupule ordered Metia to resign as a member of parliament. When the Falekaupule attempted to enforce these directives through legal action, in Nukufetau v Metia, the High Court of Tuvalu determined that the directives of the Falekaupule should be rejected as the Constitution of Tuvalu was structured around the concept of a parliamentary democracy and that "[o]ne of the most fundamental aspects of parliamentary democracy is that, whilst a person is elected to represent the people of the district from which he is elected, he is not bound to act in accordance with the directives of the electorate either individually or as a body".

In September 2012 he was taken ill, and spent the following months in New Zealand. He flew back to Tuvalu to vote in Parliament to approve the budget on 13 December, was admitted to the small country's Intensive Care Unit, then was flown to Fiji on 20 December where he was immediately admitted to the Suva Private Hospital. He died in hospital the following day.

The by-election caused by his death would decide the future of the Telavi government, reduced by his death to a parity of seven seats apiece with the Opposition in Parliament. The government had previously survived a by-election in August 2011 caused by the death of Minister for Works Isaia Italeli. The calling of a by-election for Nukufetau was delayed until the High Court of Tuvalu ordered the Prime Minister to issue a notice of elections five days after the judgment, which was delivered on 29 May 2013. The election was eventually held on 28 June; Opposition candidate Elisala Pita won with more than two-thirds of the vote.

Political offices
Preceded by Bikenibeu Paeniu	Minister of Finance of Tuvalu; 2006-2010	Succeeded by Monise Laafai
Preceded by Monise Laafai	Minister of Finance of Tuvalu; 2010-2012	Succeeded by Maatia Toafa
