= Otinielu Tausi =

Tuvaluan politician

The Right Honourable Otinielu Tauteleimalae Tausi
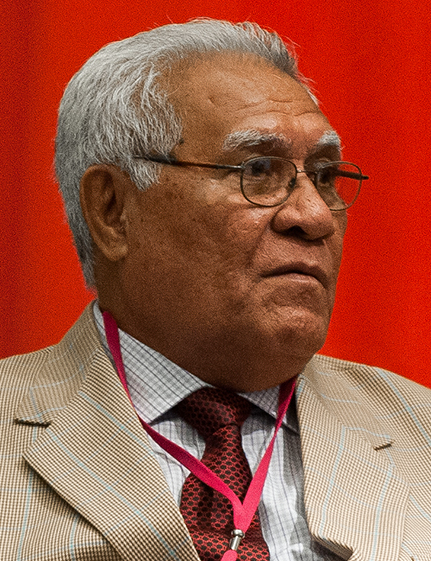
- Tausi in 2017

Deputy Prime Minister of Tuvalu
- In office 10 December 1993 – 27 April 1999
- Monarch: Elizabeth II
- Governors-General: Tomu Sione; Tulaga Manuella; Tomasi Puapua

Speaker of the Parliament of Tuvalu
- In office 2 August 2002 – 14 August 2006
- Prime Minister: Saufatu Sopoanga; Maatia Toafa
- Preceded by: Faimalaga Luka
- Succeeded by: Kamuta Latasi
- In office 3 March 2014 – 9 September 2019
- Prime Minister: Enele Sopoaga
- Preceded by: Kamuta Latasi
- Succeeded by: Samuelu Teo

Otinielu Tauteleimalae Tausi is a politician from Tuvalu for the constituency of Nanumanga. He served as the speaker of the Parliament of Tuvalu from 2003 until 2006, then again from March 2014 onward, and has also been the deputy prime minister of Tuvalu.

Following the general election on 25 November 1993 the subsequent parliament elected Kamuta Latasi as prime minister on 10 December 1993. Tausi was the deputy prime minister in the government of Kamuta Latasi (December 1993 to December 1996); Deputy Prime Minister and Minister for Natural Resources and also the Home Affairs and Rural Development in the 2nd government of Bikenibeu Paeniu (1996 to 1998); and after the 1998 Tuvaluan general election he moved to the Ministry of Works, Energy and Communications in the 3rd government of Paeniu.

He was appointed the speaker of the parliament from 2003 to 2006 during the governments of Saufatu Sopoanga and Maatia Toafa.

He was not re-elected in the 2010 general election. Dr Falesa Pitoi, who was elected, became ill and was unable to attend parliament. In late 2013, following an assessment of Dr Pitoi's health, the governor-general declared a vacancy for the constituency of Nanumanga. The polling date for the by-election occurred on 14 January 2014. Otinielu Tausi was the successful candidate. Following his election, he chose to join the parliamentary majority of prime minister Enele Sopoaga. Tausi was elected as speaker on 3 March 2014 to replace, Sir Kamuta Latasi. He was re-elected as the speaker following the 2015 Tuvaluan general election.

He was not re-elected in the 2019 general election.
