= Kokea Malua =

Tuvaluan politician

Kokea Malua MBE is a politician from Tuvalu. He has served in the Parliament of Tuvalu on numerous occasions representing the electorate of Nanumea.

Malua was appointed Member of the Order of the British Empire (MBE) in the 1980 New Year Honours.

He served as a government minister and was appointed as the speaker of the Parliament from 1989 to 1993 during the 1st prime ministership of Bikenibeu Paeniu.

He lost his seat in the run-off election in 1993, which was held because the earlier election in 1993 has produced a deadlock in the parliament.

He was re-elect to parliament in the 1998 Tuvaluan general election. He was the Deputy Prime Minister, Minister for Natural Resources and the Environment as well as Home Affairs and Rural Development, during the second term of the prime ministership of Bikenibeu Paeniu (1998-1999).

He was the Ministry of Natural Resources and Environment in the government led by Koloa Talake (2001-2002). He lost his seat in the 2002 Tuvaluan general election.

Malua was returned to parliament on 15 June 2005 in a by-election, which he won by a margin of 59 votes. He was appointed as Minister for Natural Resources and the Environment as well as Home Affairs and Rural Development of the 2nd government led by Bikenibeu Paeniu. Malua also was appointed Deputy Prime Minister. However he was not re-elected in the 2006 Tuvaluan general election.
