= 1985 Tuvaluan general election =

- 12 September 1985

All 12 seats in the Parliament of Tuvalu
	First party
Party	Independents
Seats won	12
Prime Minister before election
Tomasi Puapua
Subsequent
Prime Minister
Tomasi Puapua

General elections were held in Tuvalu on 12 September 1985. As there were no political parties, all candidates for the twelve seats ran as independents, with nine of the incumbents retaining their seats. Tomasi Puapua was re-elected Prime Minister following the elections.

== Results ==
Nine incumbent members were re-elected, including Prime Minister Tomasi Puapua and Minister of Finance Henry Naisali. On 21 September, Tomasi Puapua was re-elected as Prime Minister; he subsequently appointed a five-member Cabinet.

Party	Seats	+/–
Independents	12	0
Total	12	0
Source: Nohlen et al.
