= Government House, Funafuti =

Official residence of the Governor-General of Tuvalu

Coordinates: 8.528037°S 179.192048°E

Government House, Funafuti is the official residence of the governor-general of Tuvalu, the representative of the monarch in Tuvalu's constitutional monarchy. It is located in Funafuti, the capital of Tuvalu, and forms part of the country's central government infrastructure.

== Description ==
Government House is situated on Fongafale islet in Funafuti, close to other government buildings and the Funafuti airstrip. The huilding is a single-storey structure and serves as the official residence of the governor-general while in the capital.
