= Secretary General of the Pacific Islands Forum Secretariat =

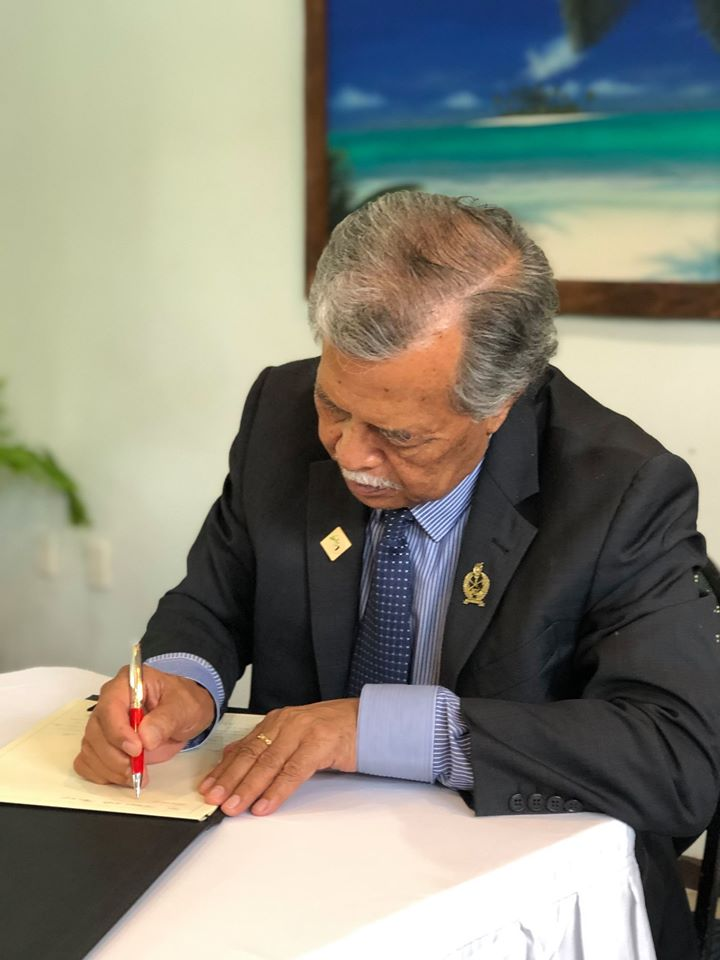
Former Secretary General Puna

The Secretary General of the Pacific Islands Forum Secretariat is the chief executive officer of the Pacific Islands Forum Secretariat (PIFS). The Secretariat is based in Suva, Fiji.

The Secretary General of the Secretariat is appointed to a three-year term in office by the leaders of the Pacific Islands Forum member states. The Secretary General reports directly to the leaders of the member states and the Forum Officials' Committee (FOC). He or she automatically serves as the permanent chairman or chairwoman of the Council of Regional Organisations in the Pacific (CROP).

== Responsibilities ==
The Secretary General is responsible for a variety of roles and responsibilities within the Pacific Islands Forum and the Secretariat. The responsibilities to PIF member states and observers include the following:

- Providing "high quality" leadership to the member states.
- Effectively bring executive management to the office of the Forum Secretariat, as well as its staff and assets.
- Deliver advice and service to member nations of the Pacific Islands Forum.
- Advocate the interests of the Pacific Islands Forum to other international organizations, as well as non-governmental organizations.
- Leading and managing the Pacific Islands Forum (PIF), a meeting of the member states' national leaders, as well as the Forum Officials Committee (FOC). This role includes attending and leading the Pacific Islands Forum ministerial meetings, committees, councils and working groups which may be established by either the PIF or the FOC.
- The Secretary General is chair of the Council of Regional Organisations in the Pacific (CROP).
- Oversee the implementation of any mandates or directives of the Pacific Islands Forum and the Forum Officials Committee.
- Effectively implement the Secretariat's work programme.

== List of secretaries general ==
Please note: Dates may not be correct.

No.	Image	Name	Country	Took office	Left office	Ref
Directors of the South Pacific Bureau for Economic Co-operation
1		Mahe Tupouniua	Tonga	November 1972	1980	
2		Gabriel Gris	Papua New Guinea	1980	1982 (died in office)	
–		John Sheppard (acting)	Australia	1982	January 1983	
3		Mahe Tupouniua	Tonga	January 1983	January 1986	
4		Henry Naisali	Tuvalu	January 1986	September 1988	
Secretary General of the Pacific Islands Forum
–		Henry Naisali	Tuvalu	September 1988	31 January 1992	
5		Ieremia Tabai	Kiribati	31 January 1992	January 1998	
6		Noel Levi	Papua New Guinea	February 1998	February 2004	
7		Greg Urwin	Australia	February 2004	2 May 2008 (resigned)	
–		Feleti Teo (acting)	Tuvalu	2 May 2008	13 October 2008	
8		Tuiloma Neroni Slade	Samoa	13 October 2008	4 December 2014	
9		Meg Taylor	Papua New Guinea	4 December 2014	24 May 2021	
10		Henry Puna	Cook Islands	24 May 2021	23 May 2024	
11		Baron Waqa	Nauru	3 June 2024	Incumbent	

== See also ==
- Pacific Islands Forum
