= 1981 Tuvaluan general election =

- 8 September 1981

All 12 seats in the Parliament of Tuvalu
	First party
Party	Independents
Seats won	12
Prime Minister before election
Toaripi Lauti
Subsequent
Prime Minister
Tomasi Puapua

General elections were held in Tuvalu on 8 September 1981. Voter turnout was 85%.

== Campaign ==
A total of 26 candidates contested the 12 seats. As there were no political parties, all candidates ran as independents.

In Nanumea one candidate, Telavi Faati, called for the island be independent.

== Results ==
Eight of the twelve incumbent MPs retained their seats, with two ministers losing theirs.

Party	Votes	%	Seats	+/–
Independents			12	0
Total			12	0
Total votes	2,862	–		
Registered voters/turnout	3,368	84.98		
Source: Nohlen et al.

== Aftermath ==
Tomasi Puapua was elected Prime Minister with a 7–5 majority over the group a members of parliament headed by former Prime Minister Toaripi Lauti. Puapua appointed a five-member cabinet, keeping the portfolios of foreign affairs and local government for himself. Henry Naisali became Deputy Prime Minister and Minister of Finance, Lale Seluka was appointed Minister for Commerce and Natural Resources, Falaile Pilitati became Minister for Social Services and Solomona Tealofi was appointed Minister for Works and Communications.
