= Naama Maheu Latasi =

Member of the Parliament of Tuvalu

Naama Maheu Latasi, Lady Latasi (died 16 March 2012) was a Tuvaluan politician. She stood for election in the constituency of Nanumea in 1989 and was elected to the Parliament of Tuvalu. Lady Latasi served as Minister of Health, Education and Community Services in the first Government of Prime Minister of Tuvalu Bikenibeu Paeniu. She was the first female member of parliament in Tuvaluan history. An amazing feat, that served to both pave the way for other aspiring female members of parliament today, but propelled the movement of gender equality. She served in Parliament from 1989 to 1997. Although she was not re-elected in the first 1993 general election but regained her seat in parliament in the second 1993 general election.

== Involvement in the Girl Guides movement ==
In 1967, she set up the Olave Kindergarten, named after the founder of the Girl Guides movement, Lady Olave Baden Powell.

In 1975, Lady Latasi was influential in setting up the headquarters for the Girl Guides Association of Tuvalu in Funafuti following the separation of the Ellice Islands from the Gilbert Islands. She was appointed the first Tuvalu Girl Guides Commissioner.

== Biography ==
Lady Latasi was the first woman to be elected to the Parliament of Tuvalu. She remained the only woman ever to have served in the Tuvaluan Parliament until Pelenike Isaia won the August 2011 by-election for the constituency of Nui.

In the 1993 New Year Honours, she was appointed an Officer of the Order of the British Empire (OBE) for public and community services.

She was married to Sir Kamuta Latasi, a former Prime Minister of Tuvalu and subsequently Speaker of the Parliament of Tuvalu. Lady Latasi died on 16 March 2012.

== See also ==
- Politics of Tuvalu
