= Samuelu Teo =

Tuvaluan politician (1957–2024)

The Honourable Samuelu Teo MP
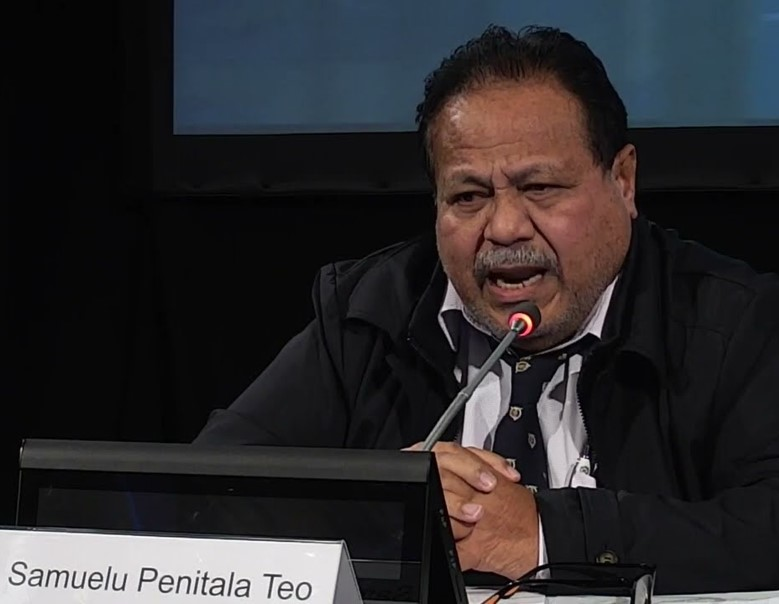
- Teo in 2022

Speaker of the Parliament of Tuvalu
- In office 20 September 2019 – 27 January 2024
- Prime Minister: Kausea Natano
- Preceded by: Otinielu Tausi
- Succeeded by: Iakoba Italeli

Acting Governor-General of Tuvalu
- In office January 2021 – 28 September 2021
- Monarch: Elizabeth II
- Prime Minister: Kausea Natano
- Preceded by: Teniku Talesi (acting)
- Succeeded by: Tofiga Vaevalu Falani

Minister of Works, Energy and Communications (1999–2001); Minister for Natural Resources (2001–2002)
- In office 1999–2002
- Prime Minister: Ionatana Ionatana (1999–2000); Lagitupu Tuilimu (2000–2001); Faimalaga Luka (2001); and Koloa Talake (2001–2002)

Member of the Tuvaluan Parliament for Niutao
- In office 26 March 1998 – 3 August 2006

Member of the Tuvaluan Parliament for Niutao (serving with Fauoa Maani)
- In office 31 March 2015 – 26 January 2024
- Preceded by: Vete Sakaio

Personal details
- Born: Samuelu Penitala Teo; 24 November 1957
- Died: 13 November 2024 (aged 66)
- Party: Independent

Samuelu Penitala Teo (24 November 1957 – 13 November 2024) was a Tuvaluan politician. He was the son of Fiatau Penitala Teo who was appointed as the first Governor General of Tuvalu (1978–1986) following independence from Great Britain. Samuelu Teo himself served as the Acting Governor-General of Tuvalu from January until 28 September 2021. He had succeeded Acting Governor-General Teniku Talesi and remained in office until the Rev. Tofiga Vaevalu Falani was sworn in as the 10th Governor-General in September 2021.

He was born on 24 November 1957. His spouse was Miliaga Samuelu Teo.

== Career ==
He was first elected to the Parliament of Tuvalu at the 1998 general election to represent the constituency of Niutao. He served as the Minister of Works, Energy and Communications in the governments led by Ionatana Ionatana (1999–2000) and Lagitupu Tuilimu (2000–2001). He was the Minister for Natural Resources in the governments led by Faimalaga Luka (2001) and Koloa Talake (2001–2002). He was re-elected in the 2002 Tuvaluan general election, then lost his seat in the 2006 Tuvaluan general election when the vote of the Tuvaluan electorate resulted in the election of 8 new members to the 15 member parliament.

Samuelu Teo was again elected to represent Niutao in the 2015 Tuvaluan general election. The 2015 election was strongly contested with six candidates including the two incumbent MPs (Vete Sakaio and Fauoa Maani) and three former MPs (Tomu Sione, Tavau Teii and Teo).

Following the 2019 Tuvaluan general election, on 19 September 2019, the members of parliament elected Kausea Natano from Funafuti as prime minister; and Teo was elected as Speaker of the Parliament of Tuvalu.

He was not re-elected in the 2024 Tuvaluan general election.

His brother Feleti Penitala Teo was elected to represent Niutao in the 2024 general election, and was elected as prime minister.

Government offices
Preceded by Mrs. Teniku Talesi Honolulu; Acting	Governor General of Tuvalu; Acting; 2021	Succeeded by Tofiga Vaevalu Falani
