= Tomu Sione =

Tuvaluan politician (1941–2016)

The Right Honourable Sir Tomu Sione GCMG OBE

4th Governor-General of Tuvalu
- In office 1 December 1993 – 21 June 1994
- Monarch: Elizabeth II
- Prime Minister: Bikenibeu Paeniu; Kamuta Latasi
- Preceded by: Sir Toaripi Lauti
- Succeeded by: Sir Tulaga Manuella

5th Speaker of the Parliament of Tuvalu
- In office 1998–2002
- Prime Minister: Bikenibeu Paeniu; Ionatana Ionatana; Lagitupu Tuilimu; Faimalaga Luka; Koloa Talake
- Preceded by: Tomasi Puapua
- Succeeded by: Saloa Tauia

Personal details
- Born: 17 November 1941
- Died: April 2016 (aged 74)

Sir Tomu Malaefone Sione (17 November 1941 – April 2016) was a political figure from the Pacific nation of Tuvalu. He worked as a journalist from 1962 to 1968, and held the post of radio announcer in the Broadcasting and Information Department of the administration of the Gilbert and Ellice Islands Colony (GEIC). He was the head of the southern Niutao clan. He was married to Segali.

== Member of Parliament ==
Tomu Sione was first elected to represent the constituency of Niutao in the House of Assembly of the GEIC in 1970. He was re-elected in the 1971 Gilbert and Ellice Islands general election, and in the 1974 Gilbert and Ellice Islands general election. Following the separation of Tuvalu from Kiribati he served in the House of Assembly of the Colony of Tuvalu. From 1975 to 1978 he was the minister for commerce and natural resources in the cabinet of the Chief Minister Toalipi Lauti.

Following independence Tomu Sione was elected to represent the constituency of Niutao in the Parliament of Tuvalu in the elections held on 27 August 1977. He became the longest serving member of parliament.

He was the Minister of Commerce and Natural Resources in the government of Toaripi Lauti, and Minister for National Resources and Home Affairs from 1989 to 1993 in the government of Bikenibeu Paeniu.

Sione was re-elected in the first 1993 general election, which resulted in a hung parliament, as no government could be formed. He agree with the members of the Paeniu team of candidates in the second 1993 elections, that he would not stand for parliament. Bikenibeu Paeniu was the caretaker prime minister and proceeded to have Sione appointed as the Governor-General, as Toaripi Lauti, the incumbent Governor-General was due to retire as he had reached the retirement age of 65 years.

== Governor-General ==
Sione served as Governor-General of Tuvalu from 1993 to 1994, as the representative of Elizabeth II, Queen of Tuvalu. He was sworn in as the Governor-General on 29 November 1993. His role as a minister in the Bikenibeu Paeniu cabinet, which was not returned to government in the first 1993 general election or the second 1993 general election, and the view held by that his appointment had not been made with the appropriate consultative process, lead to the government of Kamuta Latasi to advise Her Majesty the Queen to terminate his appointment as Governor-General. His office was terminated by Queen Elizabeth II in June 1994. The members of the opposition and the opinions expressed by the leaders of 3 of the islands, including Sione's home island of Niutao, had opposed this course of action as being culturally, socially and traditionally insensitive and disrespectful of the dignity of the office of the Governor-General.

== Later political career ==
Somewhat unusually for a former Governor-General, Sione later stood again for parliament. He was elected by the constituency of Niutao in the 1998 Tuvaluan general election, and served as Speaker of the Parliament from 1998 to 2002.

Sione lost his seat in the 2002 Tuvaluan general election, however he was re-elected in the 2006 Tuvaluan general election and was subsequent appointed as chairman of the parliamentary caucus in the Administration of Prime Minister of Tuvalu Apisai Ielemia.

He represented the constituency of Niutao until the 2010 Tuvaluan general election.

=== Unsuccessful attempt at political comeback ===
Having been out of parliament for 5 years, he was a candidate in the 2015 Tuvaluan general election and received 300 votes, but was not elected.

== Honours ==
Sione was appointed Officer of the Order of the British Empire (OBE) in the 1990 Birthday Honours for services to the community, and appointed Knight Grand Cross of the Order of St Michael and St George (GCMG) in 2001.

Government offices
Preceded by Sir Toaripi Lauti	Governor-General of Tuvalu; 1993–1994	Succeeded by Sir Tulaga Manuella
