= Prime Minister of Tuvalu =

Head of government

- Ulu o te Malo o Tuvalu (Tuvaluan)
- Coat of Arms of Tuvalu

- State Flag of Tuvalu

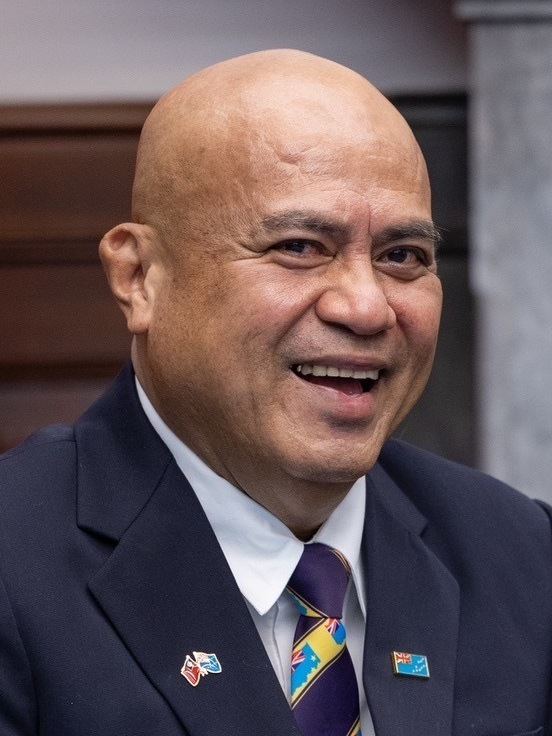
- Incumbent; Feleti Teo since 26 February 2024
- Style: The Right Honourable
- Appointer: Elected by the members of the parliament
- Term length: While commanding the confidence of the majority of members of parliament. No term limits are imposed on the office.
- Inaugural holder: Toaripi Lauti
- Formation: 1 October 1978
- Salary: AU$ 40,840/US$ 26,660 annually

The prime minister of Tuvalu is the country's head of government. According to Tuvalu's constitution, the prime minister must always be a member of the parliament and is elected by parliament in a secret ballot. Because there are no political parties in Tuvalu, any member of parliament can be nominated for the role.

Part V, section 62 of the Constitution of Tuvalu describes the vesting of the executive authority:

(1) The executive authority of Tuvalu is primarily vested in the Sovereign, and the Governor-General as the representative of the Sovereign.
(2) The executive authority so vested in the Sovereign shall be exercised in accordance with section 53 (performance of functions by the Head of State).

Following the parliamentary vote, the governor-general of Tuvalu is responsible for swearing in as the prime minister the person who commands the confidence of a majority of members of parliament.

Part V of the Constitution establishes the executive authority of Tuvalu and confirms that while the Prime Minister is the head of government, executive power is exercised by ministerial government, with Part V, section 67 to 69 establishing the role of the cabinet.

The office of prime minister was established when Tuvalu gained independence in 1978. However, the post is sometimes considered a continuation of the earlier office of chief minister, created in 1975. If the prime minister dies, as has happened on one occasion, the deputy prime minister becomes acting prime minister until a new one is elected by parliament. The prime minister can lose his office by resigning, being defeated in a motion of no confidence by parliament, or losing his seat in a parliamentary election.

Part V, Section 63 of the Constitution of Tuvalu establishes the office of Prime Minister. Under section 64, the Prime Minister is elected by the members of parliament, with sections 64 to 67 describing what happens if the office of the Prime Minister becomes vacant, the removal from office of an incapacitated Prime Minister, the process for the suspension of the Prime Minister, and the effect of removal or suspension of the Prime Minister.

Until the Second Toafa Ministry in 2010, the prime minister also had the role of foreign minister. Enele Sopoaga was the foreign minister in the short-lived Second Toafa Ministry. In subsequent ministries, foreign affairs was another minister's responsibility in the cabinet.

Several former prime ministers have been appointed the governor-general of Tuvalu.

Feleti Teo was appointed as prime minister on 26 February 2024, after he was elected unopposed by the parliament.

== List of prime ministers ==
Toaripi Lauti was the Chief Minister of the Ellice Islands from 1975 to 1978 when Tuvalu became an independent country. He became the first Prime Minister of Tuvalu after that.

Prime Ministers of Tuvalu
No.	Portrait	Name (Birth–Death)	Election	Term of office			Ministry	Governor-General	Monarch
No.	Portrait	Name (Birth–Death)	Election	Took office	Left office	Time in office	Ministry	Governor-General	Monarch
1		Sir Toaripi Lauti (1928–2014)	1977	1 October 1978	8 September 1981	2 years, 342 days	Lauti Ministry; 1st Ministry	Sir Fiatau Penitala Teo	Queen Elizabeth II
2		Tomasi Puapua (born 1938)	1981; 1985	8 September 1981	16 October 1989	8 years, 38 days	First Puapua Ministry; Second Puapua Ministry; 2nd Ministry	Sir Fiatau Penitala Teo	Queen Elizabeth II
2		Tomasi Puapua (born 1938)	1981; 1985	8 September 1981	16 October 1989	8 years, 38 days	First Puapua Ministry; Second Puapua Ministry; 2nd Ministry	Sir Tupua Leupena	Queen Elizabeth II
3		Bikenibeu Paeniu (born 1956)	1989; 1993 (Sep)	16 October 1989	10 December 1993	4 years, 55 days	First Paeniu Ministry; 3rd Ministry	Sir Tupua Leupena	Queen Elizabeth II
3		Bikenibeu Paeniu (born 1956)	1989; 1993 (Sep)	16 October 1989	10 December 1993	4 years, 55 days	First Paeniu Ministry; 3rd Ministry	Sir Toaripi Lauti	Queen Elizabeth II
3		Bikenibeu Paeniu (born 1956)	1989; 1993 (Sep)	16 October 1989	10 December 1993	4 years, 55 days	First Paeniu Ministry; 3rd Ministry	Sir Tomu Sione	Queen Elizabeth II
4		Sir Kamuta Latasi (born 1936)	1993 (Nov)	10 December 1993	24 December 1996	3 years, 14 days	Latasi Ministry; 4th Ministry	Sir Tomu Sione	Queen Elizabeth II
4		Sir Kamuta Latasi (born 1936)	1993 (Nov)	10 December 1993	24 December 1996	3 years, 14 days	Latasi Ministry; 4th Ministry	Sir Tulaga Manuella	Queen Elizabeth II
(3)		Bikenibeu Paeniu (born 1956)	1993 (Nov); 1998	24 December 1996	27 April 1999	2 years, 124 days	Second Paeniu Ministry; Third Paeniu Ministry; 5th Ministry	Sir Tulaga Manuella	Queen Elizabeth II
(3)		Bikenibeu Paeniu (born 1956)	1993 (Nov); 1998	24 December 1996	27 April 1999	2 years, 124 days	Second Paeniu Ministry; Third Paeniu Ministry; 5th Ministry	Sir Tomasi Puapua	Queen Elizabeth II
5		Ionatana Ionatana (1938–2000)	1998	27 April 1999	8 December 2000	1 year, 225 days	Ionatana Ministry; 6th Ministry	Sir Tomasi Puapua	Queen Elizabeth II
Acting^{1}		Lagitupu Tuilimu	—	8 December 2000	24 February 2001	78 days	Tuilimu Ministry; 6th Ministry (Cont.)	Sir Tomasi Puapua	Queen Elizabeth II
6		Faimalaga Luka (1940–2005)	1998	24 February 2001	14 December 2001	293 days	Luka Ministry; 7th Ministry	Sir Tomasi Puapua	Queen Elizabeth II
7		Koloa Talake (1934–2008)	1998	14 December 2001	2 August 2002	231 days	Talake Ministry; 8th Ministry	Sir Tomasi Puapua	Queen Elizabeth II
8		Saufatu Sopoanga (1952–2020)	2002	2 August 2002	27 August 2004	2 years, 25 days	Sopoanga Ministry; 9th Ministry	Sir Tomasi Puapua	Queen Elizabeth II
8		Saufatu Sopoanga (1952–2020)	2002	2 August 2002	27 August 2004	2 years, 25 days	Sopoanga Ministry; 9th Ministry	Faimalaga Luka	Queen Elizabeth II
9		Maatia Toafa (1954–2024)	2002	27 August 2004	14 August 2006	1 year, 352 days	First Toafa Ministry; 10th Ministry	Faimalaga Luka	Queen Elizabeth II
9		Maatia Toafa (1954–2024)	2002	27 August 2004	14 August 2006	1 year, 352 days	First Toafa Ministry; 10th Ministry	Sir Filoimea Telito	Queen Elizabeth II
10		Apisai Ielemia (1955–2018)	2006	14 August 2006	29 September 2010	4 years, 46 days	Ielemia Ministry; 11th Ministry	Sir Filoimea Telito	Queen Elizabeth II
10		Apisai Ielemia (1955–2018)	2006	14 August 2006	29 September 2010	4 years, 46 days	Ielemia Ministry; 11th Ministry	Sir Kamuta Latasi	Queen Elizabeth II
10		Apisai Ielemia (1955–2018)	2006	14 August 2006	29 September 2010	4 years, 46 days	Ielemia Ministry; 11th Ministry	Sir Iakoba Italeli	Queen Elizabeth II
(9)		Maatia Toafa (1954–2024)	2010	29 September 2010	24 December 2010	86 days	Second Toafa Ministry; 12th Ministry	Sir Iakoba Italeli	Queen Elizabeth II
11		Willy Telavi (born 1954)	2010	24 December 2010	1 August 2013	2 years, 220 days	Telavi Ministry; 13th Ministry	Sir Iakoba Italeli	Queen Elizabeth II
12		Enele Sopoaga (born 1956)	2010; 2015	1 August 2013	19 September 2019	6 years, 49 days	Sopoaga Ministry; 14th Ministry	Sir Iakoba Italeli	Queen Elizabeth II
13		Kausea Natano (born 1957)	2019	19 September 2019	26 February 2024	4 years, 160 days	Natano Ministry; 15th Ministry	Mrs. Teniku Talesi, Samuelu Teo	Queen Elizabeth II
14		Feleti Teo (born 1962)	2024	26 February 2024	Incumbent	2 years, 219 days	Teo Ministry; 16th Ministry	Sir Tofiga Vaevalu Falani	King Charles III
14		Feleti Teo (born 1962)	2024	26 February 2024	Incumbent	2 years, 219 days	Teo Ministry; 16th Ministry	Temukisa Auina Penehuro Hauma	King Charles III

Notes

1. Tuilimu served as acting prime minister following the death of Ionatana.
2. Sir Iakoba Italeli resigned as Governor-General on 22 August 2019 to contest a seat in parliament in the 2019 general election.
3. Sir Tofiga Vaevalu Falani was appointed as Governor-General on 29 September 2021, during the term of prime minister Kausea Natano
4. King Charles III acceded to the throne on 8 September 2022, during the term of prime minister Kausea Natano.
