= Fiatau Penitala Teo =

Governor-General of Tuvalu from 1978 to 1986

His Excellency Sir Fiatau Penitala Teo GCMG ISO MBE

1st Governor-General of Tuvalu
- In office 1 October 1978 – 1 March 1986
- Monarch: Elizabeth II
- Prime Minister: Toaripi Lauti; Tomasi Puapua
- Preceded by: Position established
- Succeeded by: Sir Tupua Leupena

Personal details
- Born: 23 July 1911 Funafuti, Gilbert and Ellice Islands (present-day Tuvalu)
- Died: 25 November 1998 (aged 87) Funafuti, Tuvalu
- Spouse: Uimai Tofiga Teo

Sir Fiatau Penitala Teo GCMG ISO MBE (23 July 1911 – 25 November 1998) was a Tuvaluan politician who served as the first Governor-General of Tuvalu from 1978 to 1986. Teo was appointed Chief in the House of Chiefs of Niutao in 1945 and was reappointed as a Chief on 29 June 1997 after his term as Governor-General.

Teo was appointed as a Member of the Order of the British Empire (MBE) in the 1956 New Year Honours, a Companion of the Imperial Service Order (ISO) in the 1970 New Year Honours, and Knight Grand Cross of the Order of St Michael and St George (GCMG) in 1979.

== Background ==
When plans for Tuvalu, the former Ellice Islands colony, to become independent of the United Kingdom, the people of Tuvalu decided to retain Queen Elizabeth II as their head of state, and the post of Governor-General was established in 1978.

== Governor-General of Tuvalu ==
In 1978, Teo was appointed as the first Governor-General of Tuvalu by Elizabeth II, Queen of Tuvalu. He served from 1 October 1978 to 1 March 1986. As Governor-General, he oversaw the first change in Tuvalu's post-Independence government in 1981.

After stepping down as Governor-General in 1986, Teo was succeeded in that office by Sir Tupua Leupena.

== Death ==
Sir Fiatau Penitala Teo died on Funafuti in 1998.

== Family ==
Teo was married to Uimai (Tofiga) Teo.

His son Samuelu Teo represented Niutao in the parliament from 1998 to 2006. Samuelu Teo was again elected to represent Niutao in the 2015 Tuvaluan general election. Following the 2019 Tuvaluan general election, on 19 September 2019, the members of parliament elected Kausea Natano from Funafuti as prime minister; and Teo was elected as Speaker of the Parliament of Tuvalu.

His son Feleti Penitala Teo (b. 9 Oct. 1962) was attorney general of Tuvalu (1991-2000); and acting secretary-general of the Pacific Islands Forum (2008). He is also the current Prime Minister of Tuvalu.

== See also ==
- Politics of Tuvalu

Government offices
Preceded by —	Governor-General of Tuvalu; 1978–1986	Succeeded by Sir Tupua Leupena
