= Teniku Talesi =

Acting Governor-General of Tuvalu from 2019 to 2021

Teniku Talesi MBE
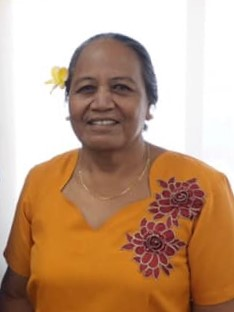
- Talesi in 2020

Acting Governor-General of Tuvalu
- In office 22 August 2019 – January 2021
- Monarch: Elizabeth II
- Prime Minister: Enele Sopoaga; Kausea Natano
- Preceded by: Iakoba Italeli
- Succeeded by: Samuelu Teo (acting)

Personal details
- Spouse: Talesi Honolulu

Teniku Talesi Honolulu MBE served as the acting governor-general of Tuvalu from 22 August 2019 until January 2021. She replaced Sir Iakoba Italeli, who resigned to contest in the 2019 general election.

She convened the Parliament of Tuvalu to meet on 19 September 2019, at which Kausea Natano was elected as prime minister of Tuvalu.

The decision of the caretaker government of Enele Sopoaga was to appoint the Governor-General to succeed Sir Iakoba Italeli, from the island of Nanumaga, which the new government of Kausea Natano accepted, however the appointment was held up as the government did not accept the process by which the nomination was carried out by the Nanumaga Falekaupule.

She carried out the functions and duties of the Governor-General, including signing a pardon for 2 Fijian nationals, and appearing at official events.

In 1998 and 2009, as Assistant Secretary in the Department of Home Affairs and Rural Development, she represented Tuvalu at different conferences (10th SPREEP Meeting of Apia in Samoa and the 5th Regular Session of Northern Committee of Western and Central Pacific Ocean Fisheries Commission). In 2012, she was the Assistant Secretary in the Department of Home Affairs and Rural Development.

Government offices
Preceded by Iakoba Italeli	Governor General of Tuvalu; Acting; 2019–2021	Succeeded by Samuelu Teo; Acting
