= Saufatu Sopoanga =

Prime Minister of Tuvalu from 2002 to 2004

The Right Honourable Saufatu Sopoanga OBE
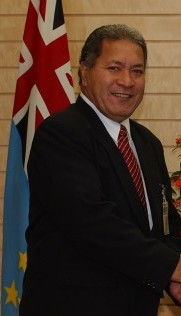
- Sopoanga in 2003

8th Prime Minister of Tuvalu
- In office 2 August 2002 – 27 August 2004
- Monarch: Elizabeth II
- Governors General: Tomasi Puapua; Faimalaga Luka
- Preceded by: Koloa Talake
- Succeeded by: Maatia Toafa

Deputy Prime Minister of Tuvalu
- In office 11 October 2004 – 14 August 2006
- Prime Minister: Maatia Toafa
- Preceded by: Maatia Toafa
- Succeeded by: Tavau Teii

Minister of Finance
- In office 14 December 2001 – 2 August 2002
- Prime Minister: Koloa Talake

Personal details
- Born: 22 February 1952 Nukufetau, Gilbert and Ellice Islands (present-day Tuvalu)
- Died: 15 December 2020 (aged 68) Tuvalu
- Spouse: Filifau Sopoanga
- Children: 4
- Relatives: Enele Sopoaga (brother)
- Education: University of Manchester; University of Liverpool

Saufatu Sopoanga (22 February 1952 – 15 December 2020) was a Tuvaluan politician who served as the eighth prime minister of Tuvalu from 2 August 2002 to 27 August 2004. He drew international attention for his speeches warning about the effects of the rising sea level on Tuvalu and other low-lying island countries.

He later served as Deputy Prime Minister from 2004 to 2006. His younger brother Enele Sopoaga served as Prime Minister of Tuvalu from 2013 to 2019.

== Early life and career ==
Sopoanga was born on Nukufetau Atoll on 22 February 1952. He received a diploma in development administration from South Devon Technical College, Torquay in 1978 and a postgraduate diploma from the University of Manchester in 1992. In 1993, he received a Master's degree from the University of Liverpool.

Sopoanga began working in the civil service of the Ellice Islands in 1973, and was a permanent secretary for different ministries between 1975 and 1995. During his time at the Ministry of Natural Resources, he facilitated visits by foreign geologists after Tuvalu became a member of the South Pacific Applied Geoscience Commission in 1984. From 1996 until his retirement in October 2000, he was a state secretary, the highest rank in the civil service.

The Electoral Provisions (Parliament) Act of Tuvalu was amended in May 2000 to increase the membership of parliament from 12 to 15 MPs. Sopoanga was elected as a member of the Parliament of Tuvalu for the constituency of Nukufetau, in a special election in November 2000, (together with Amasone Kilei and Namoto Kelisiano) and they attended their first parliamentary session on 7 December 2000. He became a Special Ministerial Adviser in the Ministry of Works, Communications & Transport to the government of Prime Minister Ionatana Ionatana. Under prime minister Koloa Talake, he served as the minister for finance, economic planning and industry.

== Prime Minister of Tuvalu ==
Sopoanga was elected Prime Minister of Tuvalu by the Parliament of Tuvalu on 2 August 2002 after the general election. He also held the foreign affairs and labour portfolios.

After being elected Prime Minister, Sopoanga announced his intention to create a plan to improve education and healthcare in Tuvalu. He attended a United Nations Sustainable Development summit in Johannesburg in September 2002, where he warned that Tuvalu would be completely submerged in 50 years due to global warming-related increases in sea level. On 24 September 2003, Sopoanga delivered a speech to the United Nations General Assembly which outlined issues facing Tuvalu on its 25th anniversary of independence, such as economic underdevelopment. He called climate change "a slow and insidious form of terrorism" against Tuvalu.

As Tuvalu's parliament is nonpartisan, both Sapoanga's government and the opposition experienced periodic defections and uncertain by-elections. Due to this instability, Sopoanga personally voiced support for making Tuvalu a republic with a directly-elected head of government.

The Sopoanga government first lost its majority in May 2003, following the results of the 2003 Nanumea by-election and the 2003 Niutao by-election. As Sopoanga did not call parliament afterward, opposition leader Amasone Kilei filed a case on 20 June 2003 with the High Court of Tuvalu seeking orders regarding the appointment of a speaker and the calling of parliament. The governor-general had already issued a notice on 19 June ordering the election of a speaker, which was won by opposition MP Faimalaga Luka. On 6 August 2003, the Chief Justice of the High Court issued his decision on the case: he declined to force the prime minister's resignation, and deferred the decision to call parliament to the governor general's reserve powers as defined under Section 116(1) of the Constitution of Tuvalu.

Sopoanga finally recalled parliament to meet in September. On 9 September, he nominated the new Speaker Faimalaga Luka as the next governor general, triggering the 2003 Nukufetau by-election in October. Elisala Pita won the by-election and joined the government's benches, restoring its majority.

On 25 August 2004, Sopoanga resigned as prime minister after a no confidence motion carried in parliament, 8–6. One of the government members was sick in New Zealand, and the Speaker Otinielu Tausi voted with the opposition due to a disagreement over Sopoanga's financial policies.

== Later career ==
After resigning as prime minister, Sopoanga resigned his seat in parliament to delay the election of a new prime minister, as the Constitution required all fifteen MPs to vote. The 2004 Nukufetau by-election was held on 7 October, and Sopoanga regained his seat. However, Maatia Toafa was elected prime minister on 11 October 2004, 8–7. Sopoanga then became deputy prime minister, also holding the Works, Communications & Transport portfolio. At the 2006 Tuvaluan general election, Sopoanga lost his seat in Parliament.

After leaving parliament, Sopoanga served as Chairman of various organizations, such as the Tuvalu National Private Sector Organization and the Public Service Commission. He was also the Secretary-General of the Tuvalu Red Cross. In 2018, he became a member of Tuvalu's Memory of the World Committee.

== Personal life ==
Sopoanga had several brothers; his younger brother Enele was also Prime Minister from 2013 to 2019. Sopoanga and his wife Filifau had four children.

=== Death ===
Sopoanga died on 15 December 2020 in Tuvalu. He received a state funeral on 22 December 2020.

== Honours ==
- Officer, Order of the British Empire (OBE), 1998 Birthday Honours

== See also ==
- Politics of Tuvalu

Political offices
Preceded by Lagitupu Tuilimu	Minister of Finance of Tuvalu; 2002-2006	Succeeded by Bikenibeu Paeniu

Political offices
Preceded by Koloa Talake	Prime Minister of Tuvalu; 2002–2004	Succeeded by Maatia Toafa
