= Limasene Teatu =

Tuvaluan diplomat

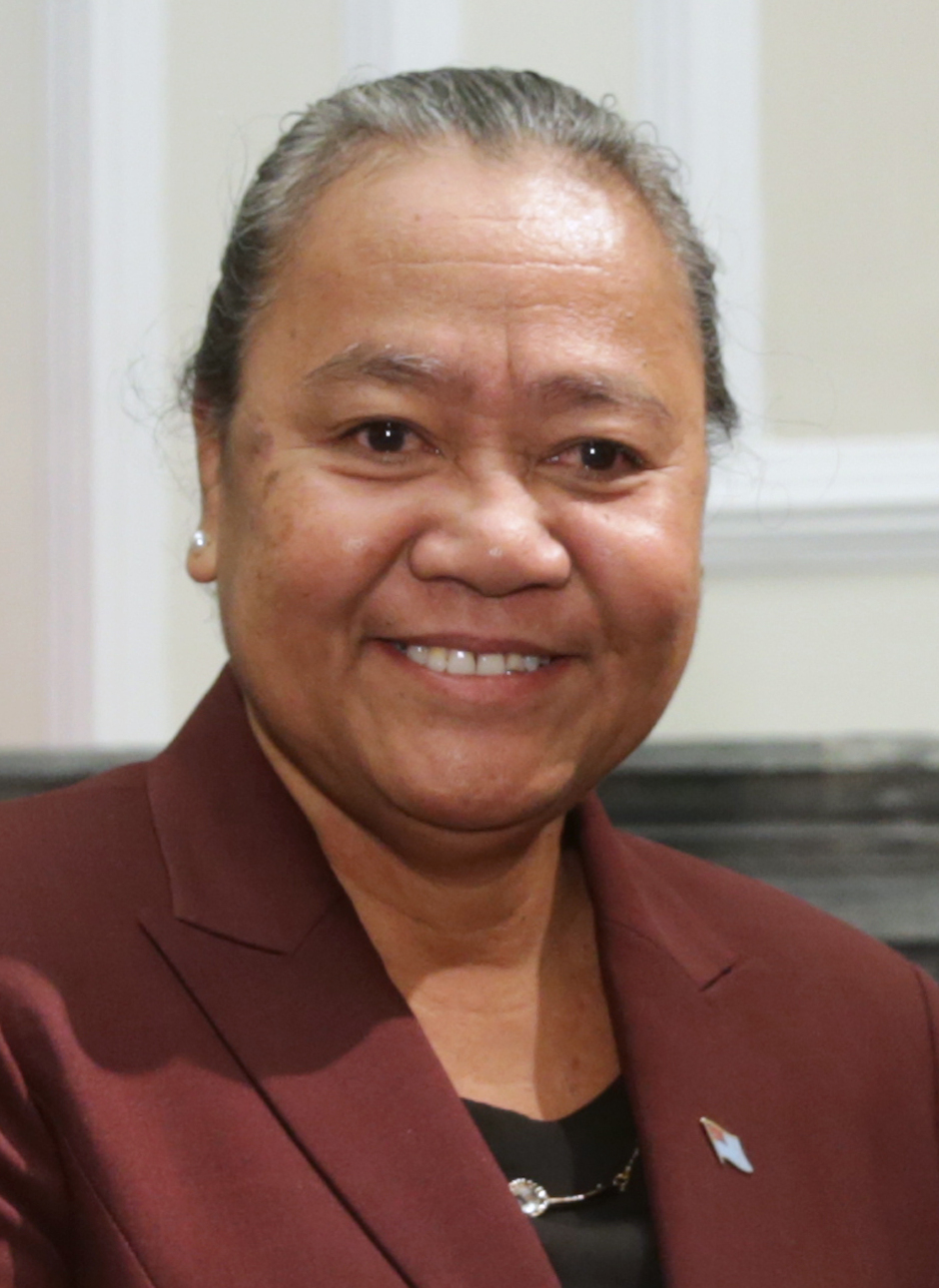
Teatu in 2017

Limasene Teatu is a Tuvaluan diplomat. In 2017, she was appointed Ambassador to Taiwan. Her appointment made her Tuvalu's first woman ambassador. She was also Tuvalu's second formally appointed ambassador to Taiwan since bilateral relations were established in 1979. Shortly before she stepped down from the ambassadorship, Taiwan awarded Teatu the Order of Brilliant Star with Special Grand Cordon.
