= Tulaga Manuella =

Governor-General of Tuvalu from 1994 to 1998

His Excellency Sir Tulaga Manuella GCMG MBE

5th Governor-General of Tuvalu
- In office 21 June 1994 – 26 June 1998
- Monarch: Elizabeth II
- Prime Minister: Kamuta Latasi; Bikenibeu Paeniu
- Preceded by: Sir Tomu Sione
- Succeeded by: Sir Tomasi Puapua

Personal details
- Born: 26 August 1936 (age 89)

Sir Tulaga Manuella, GCMG MBE (born 26 August 1936) is a political figure from the Pacific nation of Tuvalu.

== Background ==
Prior to embarking on a political role, Manuella was previously a civil service accountant and secretary of the Church of Tuvalu.

== Governor-General of Tuvalu ==
Manuella was appointed Governor-General of Tuvalu on June 21, 1994, as the representative of Elizabeth II, Queen of Tuvalu. He served in this office until June 26, 1998.

== Honours ==
Manuella was appointed Member of the Order of the British Empire (MBE) in the 1981 New Year Honours for public service, and appointed Knight Grand Cross of the Order of St Michael and St George (GCMG) in 1996.

Government offices
Preceded by Sir Tomu Sione	Governor-General of Tuvalu; 1994–1998	Succeeded by Sir Tomasi Puapua
