= Speaker of the Parliament of Tuvalu =

The Speaker of the Parliament of Tuvalu is the presiding officer of the Parliament of Tuvalu.

The annual salary of the speaker is AU$ 44,004 / US$ 28,900 per year.

== List of speakers ==
#	Name	Term	Notes
1	Sione Tui Kleis	1976–1977	
2	Tupua Leupena	1978–1978	
3	Elia Tavita	1978–1981	
4	Vave Founuku	1981–1989	
5	Kokea Malua	1989–1993	
6	Tomasi Puapua	1993–1998	
7	Tomu Sione	1998–2002	
8	Saloa Tauia	2002–2003	
9	Faimalaga Luka	2003	
10	Otinielu Tausi	2003–2006	
11	Kamuta Latasi	2006–2010	
12	Isaia Italeli	2010	
(11)	Kamuta Latasi	2010–2014	
(10)	Otinielu Tausi	2014–2019	
13	Samuelu Teo	2019–2024	
14	Sir Iakoba Italeli	2024–	
