= Kamuta Latasi =

Prime Minister of Tuvalu from 1993 to 1996

The Right Honourable Sir Kamuta Latasi KCMG OBE PC MP
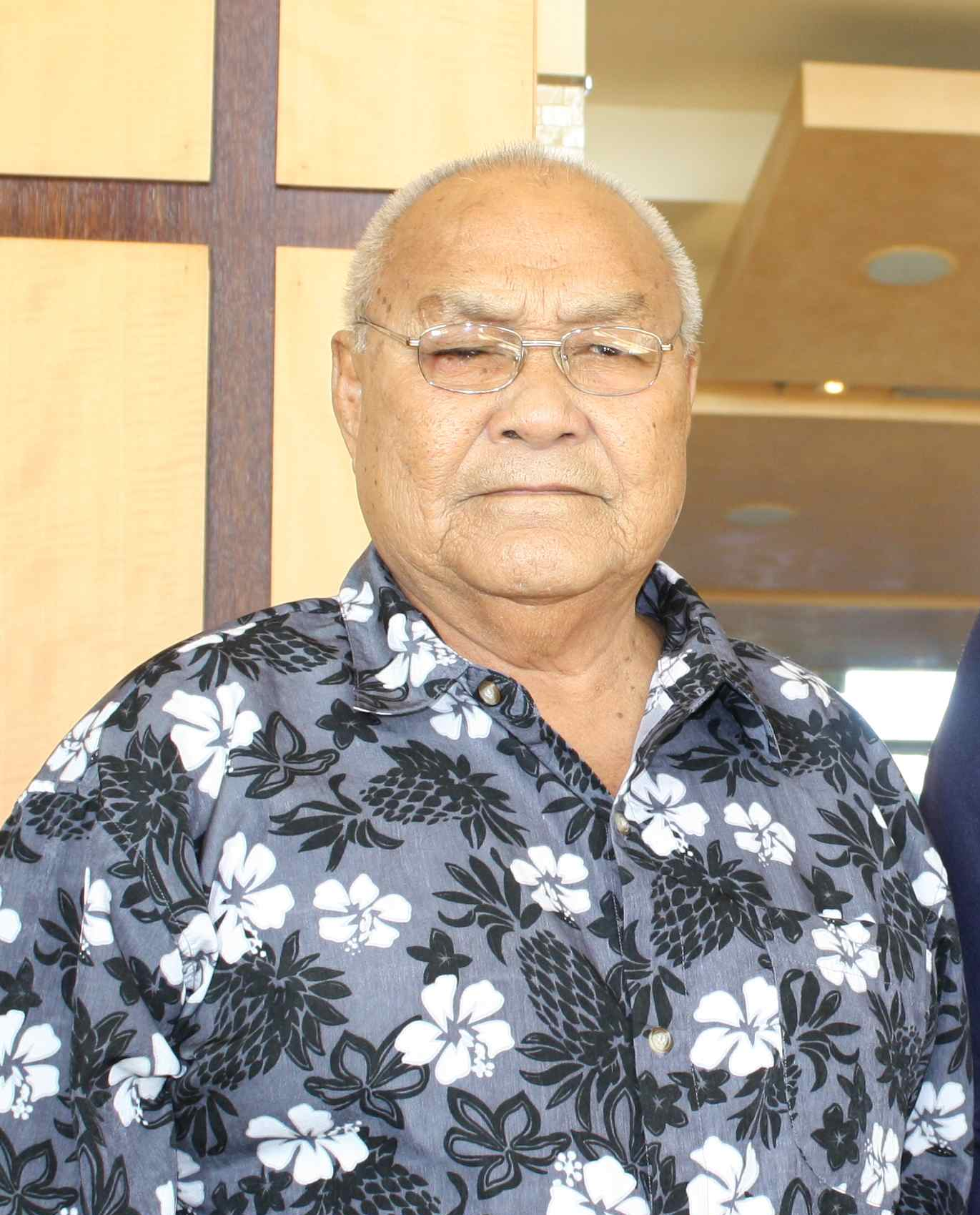
- Latasi in 2012

4th Prime Minister of Tuvalu
- In office 10 December 1993 – 24 December 1996
- Monarch: Elizabeth II
- Governors-General: Tomu Sione; Tulaga Manuella
- Preceded by: Bikenibeu Paeniu
- Succeeded by: Bikenibeu Paeniu

Speaker of the Parliament of Tuvalu
- In office 24 December 2010 – 4 March 2014
- Prime Minister: Willy Telavi; Enele Sopoaga
- Preceded by: Isaia Italeli
- Succeeded by: Otinielu Tausi
- In office 16 August 2006 – 29 September 2010
- Prime Minister: Apisai Ielemia
- Preceded by: Otinielu Tausi
- Succeeded by: Isaia Italeli

Acting Governor-General of Tuvalu
- In office 19 March 2010 – 16 April 2010
- Monarch: Elizabeth II
- Prime Minister: Apisai Ielemia
- Preceded by: Sir Filoimea Telito
- Succeeded by: Sir Iakoba Italeli

Personal details
- Born: 4 September 1936 (age 90) Laulii, Western Samoa
- Spouse: Naama Maheu Latasi

Sir Kamuta Latasi (born 4 September 1936) is a political figure from the Pacific nation of Tuvalu from Funafuti atoll. He was elected to the Parliament of Tuvalu in 1992. Latasi served as the 4th prime minister, and foreign minister, from 1993 until 1996. He has served as the Speaker of Parliament from August 2006 to September 2010 and again from December 2010 to March 2014. He was Acting Governor-General of Tuvalu from March 2010 to April 2010.

== Career ==
=== Prime Minister of Tuvalu ===
The general election held on 25 November 1993 resulted in the members being evenly split in their support of the incumbent prime minister Bikenibeu Paeniu and the former prime minister Tomasi Puapua. As a consequence, the governor-general dissolved the parliament on 22 September and a further election took place on 25 November 1993. The subsequent parliament elected Kamuta Latasi as prime minister on 10 December 1993, with a 7:5 majority over the group a members of parliament headed by former prime minister Bikenibeu Paeniu.

While many Tuvaluan politicians tend to avoid organising themselves along partisan lines, Latasi was noted for his republican leanings, together with former prime minister Ionatana Ionatana.

During his premiership, Latasi controversially removed the Union Jack from the flag of Tuvalu, replacing it with the flag pictured above. The flag was returned to the original in April 1997.

One notable issue during the premiership of Latasi was the question of the design of the national flag of Tuvalu. Latasi's government adopted a new flag on 1 October 1995, the 17th anniversary of the country's independence. It consisted of a wide horizontal light blue band bordered above and below by a thin white band (i.e. a white fimbriation) and a broad red band. Eight white five-pointed stars were spread across the fly half, a reference to the original eight islands of Tuvalu ("Tuvalu" meaning "eight standing together"), and near the hoist was a white triangle containing the Tuvaluan coat of arms. Latasi intended the move as a precursor to Tuvalu becoming a republic. However, the new flag proved unpopular among many Tuvaluans, particularly older residents, who supported the British monarchy and Tuvalu's relationship with the United Kingdom. Residents of the island of Niutao, for example, chopped down a flagpole immediately after the new flag was raised.

On 16 September 1996, Latasi's parliamentary coalition became a minority government following his unprecedented dismissal of Deputy Prime Minister Otinielu Tausi over financial irregularities, including consecutive failures to submit annual tax returns and allegations of misused public funds. Opposition leader Bikenibeu Paeniu called for Latasi to immediately resign, arguing that the opposition now had the majority in parliament and that Latasi was "hungry for power". Latasi refused, but he was successfully ousted by the opposition in a motion of no confidence on 18 December 1996, and Paeniu succeeded him as prime minister. Paeniu's new government restored the independence flag on 11 April 1997, following a 7 to 5 vote in parliament.

=== Speaker of the Parliament of Tuvalu ===
From 2006 to 2010, Latasi was the Speaker of parliament. He was re-elected to parliament by his constituency of Funafuti in the 2010 general election. Latasi was not the speaker during the short term of the government of Maatia Toafa. On 25 December 2010 Willy Telavi was elected prime minister with an (8:7) majority over Enele Sopoaga. Latasi was appointed Speaker.

Prime minister Telavi lost his majority as the result of the death of Lotoala Metia. prime minister Willy Telavi delayed calling a by-election following the death of the member from Nukufetau until the opposition took legal action, which resulted in the High Court ordering the prime minister to issue a notice to hold the by-election. The 2013 Nukufetau by-election was won by the opposition candidate.

On 30 July 2013, during the attempts of the opposition to present a no-confidence motion in the government of Willy Telavi, Latasi refused to allow a debate on the motion. The Tuvaluan constitutional crisis continued until the governor-general Iakoba Italeli then proceeded to exercise his reserve powers to order Mr Telavi's removal and appoint Enele Sopoaga as interim prime minister. The governor-general also ordered that parliament sit on Friday 2 August to allow a vote of no-confidence in Mr Telavi and his government.

Again on 2 August 2013 Willy Tevali faced a motion of no confidence, the voting was eight for the motion, four against and one abstention and Kamuta Latasi abstained for voting on the motion.

On 4 March 2014 Latasi was replaced as Speaker by Otinielu Tausi, with Prime Minister Enele Sopoaga stating that the government needed a Speaker who shared its general viewpoints. He thenceforth sat on the Opposition benches.

=== Acting Governor-General ===
In 2010 Latasi was appointed acting Governor-General between the terms of Sir Filoimea Telito and Sir Iakoba Italeli.

=== 2015 general election ===
Sir Kamuta Latasi and Kausea Natano were re-elected in the 2015 general election. Sir Kamuta Latasi resigned as MP on 17 October 2018.

== Honours ==
Latasi was appointed an Officer of the Order of the British Empire (OBE) in the 1980 Birthday Honours.

He was appointed a Knight Commander of the Order of St Michael and St George (KCMG) in the 2007 Birthday Honours for services to the community. He was given his insignia in January 2008.

== Personal life ==
Latasi is a landowner. His wife, Naama Maheu Latasi, was also a member of the Parliament of Tuvalu from 1989 to 1997. She died on 16 March 2012.

== See also ==
- Politics of Tuvalu

Preceded by Bikenibeu Paeniu	Prime Minister of Tuvalu; 1993-1996	Succeeded by Bikenibeu Paeniu
Preceded by Sir Filoimea Telito	Governor-General of Tuvalu; 2010 Acting	Succeeded by Sir Iakoba Italeli
