= Minister of Finance of Tuvalu =

The Minister of Finance of Tuvalu heads the Ministry of Finance of Tuvalu.

== Ministers of Finance ==
- Toalipi Lauti, 1977–1981
- Henry Naisali, 1981–1986
- Kitiseni Lopati, 1987–1989
- Alesana Seluka, 1989–1993
- Koloa Talake, 1993–1996
- Alesana Seluka, 1996–1999
- Lagitupu Tuilimu, 1999–2001
- Saufatu Sopoanga, 2001–2002
- Bikenibeu Paeniu, 2002–2006
- Lotoala Metia, 2006–2010
- Monise Laafai, 2010
- Lotoala Metia, 2010–2012
- Maatia Toafa, 2013–2019
- Seve Paeniu, 2019–2024
- Panapasi Nelesoni, 2024-present

== See also ==
- Economy of Tuvalu
- National Bank of Tuvalu
