= Governor-General of Tuvalu =

Representative of the monarch

- Coat of arms of Tuvalu

- Flag of the governor-general
- Incumbent; Temukisa Auina Penehuro Hauma since 30 September 2026
- Viceroy
- Style: Her Excellency
- Residence: Government House, Funafuti
- Appointer: Monarch of Tuvalu; on the advice of the prime minister
- Term length: 4 years
- Constituting instrument: Constitution of Tuvalu
- Formation: 1 October 1978
- First holder: Sir Fiatau Penitala Teo
- Salary: AU$ 45,262 / US$ 29,760 annually

The governor-general of Tuvalu is the representative of the Tuvaluan monarch, currently King Charles III, in the country of Tuvalu.

The governor-general performs the monarch's duties in Tuvalu. The constitutional convention is that the governor-general represents the monarch and acts on the advice of the prime minister.

The office of the governor-general was created on 1 October 1978, when Tuvalu gained independence from the United Kingdom as a sovereign state and an independent constitutional monarchy. Since then, ten individuals have served as governor-general. The incumbent, since 30 September 2026, is Temukisa Auina Penehuro Hauma.

== Constitutional status and appointment ==
The monarchy of Tuvalu exists in a framework of a parliamentary representative democracy. As a constitutional monarch, the King acts entirely on the advice of his government ministers in Tuvalu. The monarch is recognised in section 50 of the Constitution of Tuvalu, as a symbol of the unity and identity of Tuvalu. The powers and functions of the head of state are set out in Part IV of the Constitution.

As set out in section 55 of the Constitution, the King's representative in Tuvalu is the governor-general, who must be at least 50 years of age and be qualified to be elected as a member of parliament. The governor-general is appointed by the monarch for a four-year term. The appointment is made upon the advice of the Tuvaluan prime minister, "after the Prime Minister has, in confidence, consulted the members of Parliament".

Section 59(1) of the Constitution requires the governor-general to perform the monarch's functions when the sovereign is outside Tuvalu or otherwise incapacitated.

=== Vacancies and removal ===
The governor-general may be removed from office by the King upon the advice of the prime minister, after consultation with parliament. The office becomes vacant if the governor-general ceases to be qualified to be elected as a member of parliament, and the governor-general may also resign by submitting written notice to the speaker of the Parliament of Tuvalu.

== Functions ==
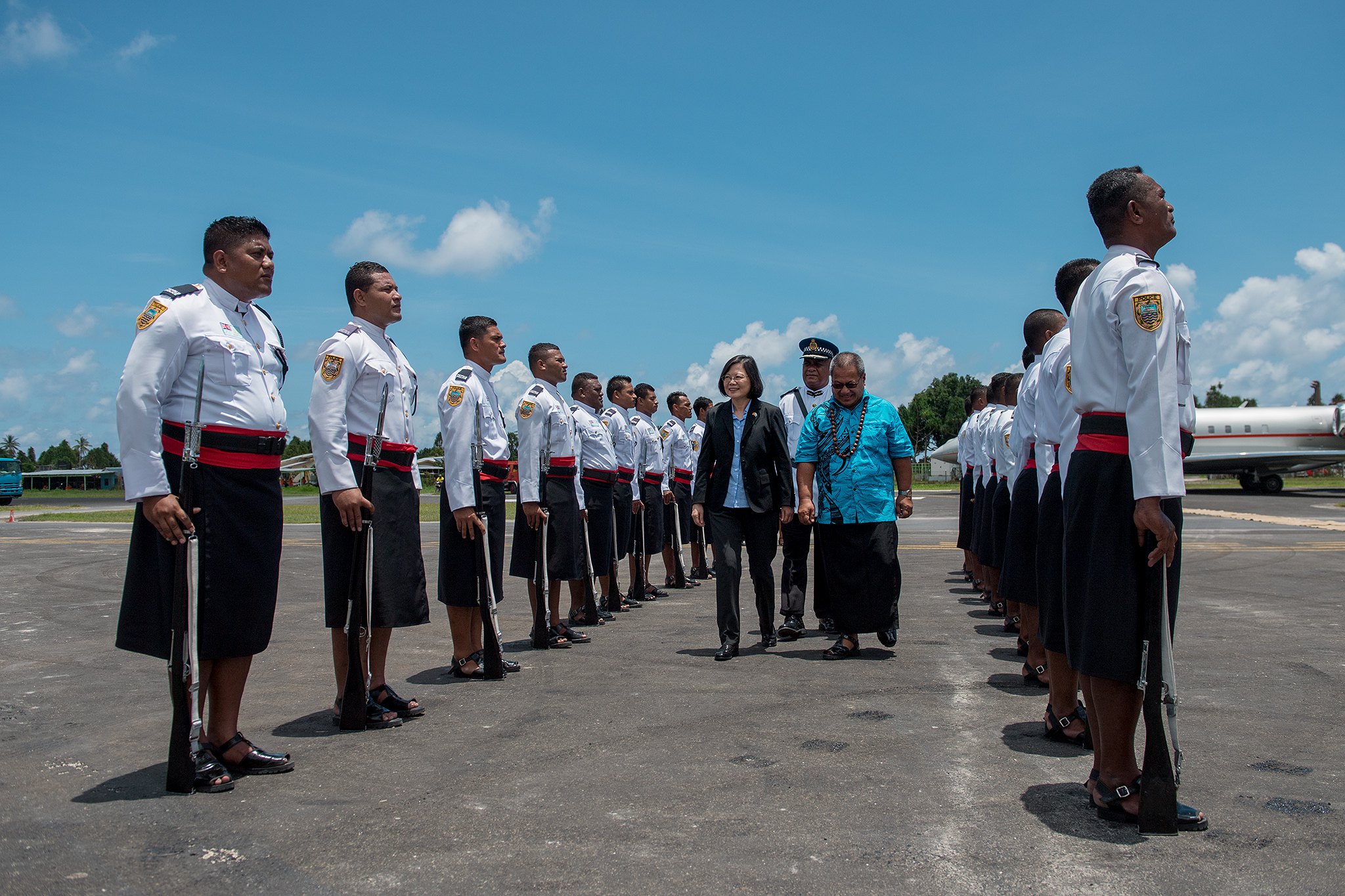
Governor-General Sir Iakoba Italeli with President Tsai Ing-wen of Taiwan in Tuvalu, 2017

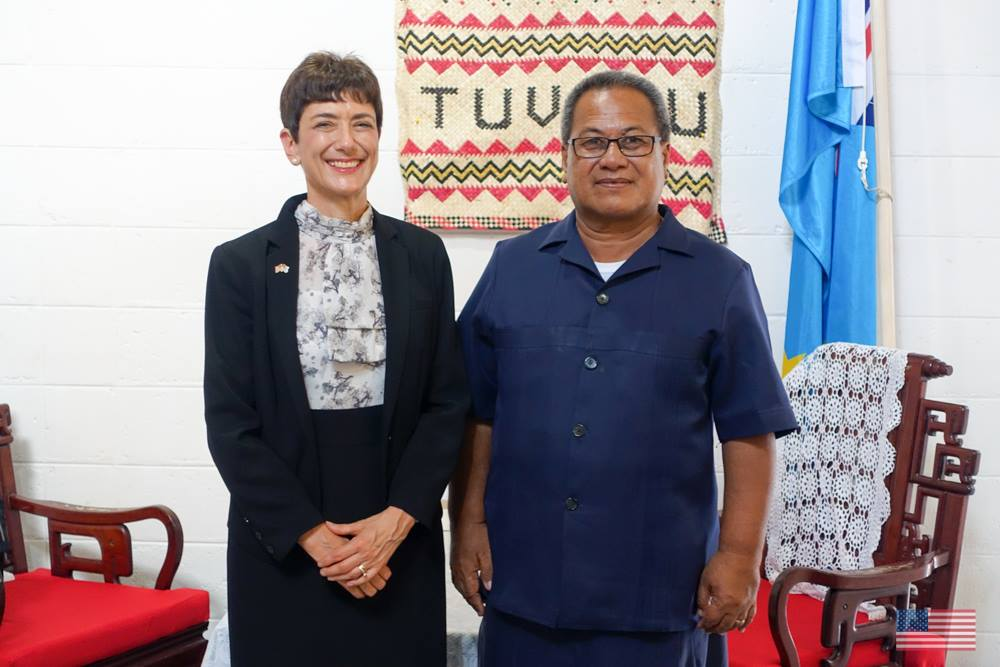
US ambassador to Tuvalu Judith Cefkin with Governor-General Sir Iakoba Italeli after presenting her letters of credence, 2015

The governor-general has constitutional responsibilities and reserve powers in relation to the ordering the Parliament of Tuvalu to convene and the appointment and dismissal of the prime minister.

=== Exercise of reserve powers ===
In 2003, the Chief Justice of the High Court of Tuvalu delivered directions as to how the governor-general should proceed to take any action they considers to be appropriate under Section 116(1) of the Constitution, acting in his own deliberate judgment, rather than as advised by the cabinet. That is, the governor-general could consider whether it was appropriate to exercise their reserve powers in calling Parliament.

The then Governor-General, Sir Iakoba Italeli was called on to exercise the reserve powers when Prime Minister Willy Telavi refused to recall parliament after the 2013 Nukufetau by-election. A constitutional crisis developed when Prime Minister Telavi responded that, under the Constitution, he was only required to convene parliament once a year, and was thus under no obligation to summon it until December 2013. Tuvalu's opposition then requested the governor-general to intervene against the prime minister's decision. On 3 July, Italeli exercised his reserve powers in ordering parliament to convene, against the prime minister's wishes, on 30 July.

When the Parliament met on 30 July, the Speaker (Sir Kamuta Latasi) refused to allow a debate on a motion of no confidence in the government of Willy Telavi. After further political maneuvers, Italeli then proceeded to exercise his reserve powers to order Telavi to stand down as prime minister and appointed Enele Sopoaga as interim prime minister. The governor-general also ordered that parliament sit on Friday 2 August to allow a vote of no-confidence in Telavi and his government. Telavi then proceeded to write to Elizabeth II, Queen of Tuvalu, informing her that he was dismissing Italeli from his position as governor-general. The Queen made no reaction at all, thus leaving Sir Iakoba secure in his post.

The constitutional crisis was resolved by a motion of no confidence in the government of Willy Tevali, which was held on 2 August 2013: the voting was eight for the motion, four against and one abstention. On 4 August the parliament elected Enele Sopoaga as prime minister.

== Symbols and privileges ==
Flag of the governor-general of Tuvalu

The governor-general uses a personal flag, which features a lion passant atop a St. Edward's royal crown with "Tuvalu" written across a scroll underneath, all on a blue background. It is flown on buildings and other locations in Tuvalu to mark the governor-general's presence.

All governors-general have been awarded the Order of St Michael and St George. Faimalaga Luka had thus far been the only governor-general to decline a knighthood.

== Residence ==
Government House in Funafuti is the official residence of the governor-general of Tuvalu.

== List of governors-general ==
Following is a list of people who have served as Governor-General of Tuvalu since independence in 1978.

A total of ten people have held the position on a permanent basis, while an additional three people have held it on an interim basis due to a vacancy. Teniku Talesi was the first woman to be appointed to the role (albeit for an interim period), holding office from the resignation of Iakoba Italeli in August 2019, until being replaced by Samuelu Teo (then also serving as Speaker of Parliament) in January 2021.

Denotes Acting Governors-General

No.	Portrait	Name (Birth–Death)	Term of office			Monarch (Reign)
No.	Portrait	Name (Birth–Death)	Took office	Left office	Time in office	Monarch (Reign)
1		Sir Fiatau Penitala Teo (1911–1998)	1 October 1978	1 March 1986	7 years, 151 days	Elizabeth II (1978–2022)
2		Sir Tupua Leupena (1922–1996)	1 March 1986	1 October 1990	4 years, 214 days	Elizabeth II (1978–2022)
3		Sir Toaripi Lauti (1928–2014)	1 October 1990	1 December 1993	3 years, 61 days	Elizabeth II (1978–2022)
4		Sir Tomu Sione (1941–2016)	1 December 1993	21 June 1994	202 days	Elizabeth II (1978–2022)
5		Sir Tulaga Manuella (born 1936)	21 June 1994	26 June 1998	4 years, 5 days	Elizabeth II (1978–2022)
6		Sir Tomasi Puapua (born 1938)	26 June 1998	9 September 2003	5 years, 75 days	Elizabeth II (1978–2022)
7		Faimalaga Luka (1940–2005)	9 September 2003	15 April 2005	1 year, 218 days	Elizabeth II (1978–2022)
8		Sir Filoimea Telito (1945–2011)	15 April 2005	19 March 2010	4 years, 338 days	Elizabeth II (1978–2022)
–		Sir Kamuta Latasi (born 1936); Acting Governor-General	19 March 2010	16 April 2010	28 days	Elizabeth II (1978–2022)
9		Sir Iakoba Italeli (b. ?)	16 April 2010	22 August 2019	9 years, 128 days	Elizabeth II (1978–2022)
–		Teniku Talesi (b. ?); Acting Governor-General	22 August 2019	January; 2021	1 year, 4 months	Elizabeth II (1978–2022)
–		Samuelu Teo (1957–2024); Acting Governor-General	January; 2021	28 September 2021	8 months	Elizabeth II (1978–2022)
10		Sir Tofiga Vaevalu Falani (b. ?)	28 September 2021	30 September 2026	5 years, 2 days	
10		Sir Tofiga Vaevalu Falani (b. ?)	28 September 2021	30 September 2026	5 years, 2 days	Charles III (2022–present)
11		Temukisa Auina Penehuro Hauma (b. 1955)	30 September 2026	Incumbent	45 days	Charles III (2022–present)

== See also ==
- Prime Minister of Tuvalu
- Governor of the Gilbert and Ellice Islands
- Monarchy of Tuvalu
