= Tupua Leupena =

Governor-General of Tuvalu from 1986 to 1990

His Excellency Sir Tupua Leupena GCMG MBE

2nd Governor-General of Tuvalu
- In office 1 March 1986 – 1 October 1990
- Monarch: Elizabeth II
- Prime Minister: Tomasi Puapua
- Preceded by: Sir Fiatau Penitala Teo
- Succeeded by: Sir Toaripi Lauti

Personal details
- Born: 2 August 1922
- Died: 24 November 1996 (aged 74)

Sir Tupua Leupena GCMG MBE (2 August 1922 – 24 November 1996) was a political figure from the Pacific nation of Tuvalu. Leupena was the Speaker of the Parliament during 1978 in the prime ministership of Toaripi Lauti.

He was appointed Member of the Order of the British Empire (MBE) in the 1977 New Year Honours.

== Governor-General of Tuvalu ==
Leupena served as the second Governor-General of Tuvalu from 1 March 1986 to 1 October 1990, representing Elizabeth II, Queen of Tuvalu.

In common with most, but not all, of Tuvalu's Governors-general, Leupena accepted a knighthood, on 24 July 1986.

Sir Tupua Leupena died on 24 November 1996, aged 74.

== See also ==
- Politics of Tuvalu
- Parliament of Tuvalu

Government offices
Preceded by Sir Fiatau Penitala Teo	Governor-General of Tuvalu; 1986–1990	Succeeded by Sir Toaripi Lauti
