= Toaripi Lauti =

Head of government of Tuvalu from 1975 to 1981

The Right Honourable Sir Toaripi Lauti GCMG PC
- Lauti at the Tuvalu Constitutional Conference in 1978

3rd Governor-General of Tuvalu
- In office 1 October 1990 – 1 December 1993
- Monarch: Elizabeth II
- Prime Minister: Bikenibeu Paeniu
- Preceded by: Tupua Leupena
- Succeeded by: Tomu Sione

1st Prime Minister of Tuvalu
- In office 1 October 1978 – 8 September 1981
- Monarch: Elizabeth II
- Governor-General: Fiatau Penitala Teo
- Preceded by: Position Established
- Succeeded by: Tomasi Puapua

1st Chief Minister of Tuvalu
- In office 2 October 1975 – 1 October 1978
- Monarch: Elizabeth II
- Governor-General: Thomas Laying
- Preceded by: Position Established
- Succeeded by: Position Abolished

Personal details
- Born: 28 November 1928 Gulf Province, Territory of Papua (now Papua New Guinea
- Died: 25 May 2014 (aged 85) Funafuti, Tuvalu
- Party: Independent
- Spouse: Sualua Tui

Sir Toaripi Lauti GCMG PC (28 November 1928 – 25 May 2014) was a Tuvaluan politician who served as chief minister of the Colony of Tuvalu (1975–78), as the first prime minister following Tuvalu's independence (1978–1981) and governor-general of Tuvalu (1990–1993). He was married to Sualua Tui.

== Education ==
Lauti was born in Toaripi village of the Territory of Papua. His father was Pastor Lauti Kae of Funafuti. He studied at Elisefou (New Ellice) primary school in Vaitupu for 6 years from 1938 to 1944. In 1945, he was sent to study in Fiji at the Londoni Provincial School, and in 1946 at the Queen Victoria School, before moving in 1947 to Wesley College in Auckland, New Zealand. From 1948 to 1951, he finished his schooling at St Andrews College in Christchurch in 1948. He attended the Teachers' Training College in Christchurch in 1952 and 1953, at the same time he was a House Master at St Andrew's College.

== Pre-Independence career ==
Toaripi Lauti was a teacher at King George V Secondary School in Tarawa from 1954 to 1962. From 1962 to 1974 he was an industrial relations officer with the British Phosphate Commissioners in Nauru. In 1974, he entered politics and became a member of the House of Assembly for the constituency of Funafuti of the Gilbert and Ellice Islands, as leader of the Opposition.

He was the first chief minister of the Colony of Tuvalu, the former Ellice Islands, from 2 October 1975 to 1 October 1978.

== Prime Minister of Tuvalu, post-independence ==
When Tuvalu became independent in 1978, he was appointed as its first prime minister. He was also the minister of finance from 1977 to 1981. He was appointed as a member of the Privy Council in 1979.

The first elections after independence were not held until 8 September 1981. At that election, Tomasi Puapua was elected as prime minister with a 7:5 majority over the group of members of parliament headed by Lauti. The administration of Toaripi Lauti had become involved in controversy, as a result of his decision to invest nearly all of the government's money with an American real estate salesman who promised 15 percent returns from the purchase of land in Texas. The investment turned out to be a fraud. While the funds were recovered by US agencies, the controversy resulted in a loss of confidence in his judgment and was an important factor in the election of Puapua.

Lauti also served as the President of the Funafuti Town Council and as a member of the Tuvalu Language Board.

== Governor-General of Tuvalu ==
His reputation was redeemed from the circumstances that ended his time as prime minister, he was the Governor-General of Tuvalu, representing Elizabeth II, Queen of Tuvalu as head of state, from 1 October 1990 through 1 December 1993. In 1990, he was appointed a Knight Grand Cross of the Order of St Michael and St George (GCMG).

Government offices
Preceded by none	Prime Minister of Tuvalu; 1978–1981	Succeeded by Tomasi Puapua
Preceded by none	Minister of Finance of Tuvalu; 1977-1981	Succeeded by Henry Naisali
Preceded by Sir Tupua Leupena	Governor-General of Tuvalu; 1990–1993	Succeeded by Sir Tomu Sione
