= Bikenibeu Paeniu =

Prime Minister of Tuvalu (1989–1993; 1996–1999)

The Right Honourable Bikenibeu Paeniu PC
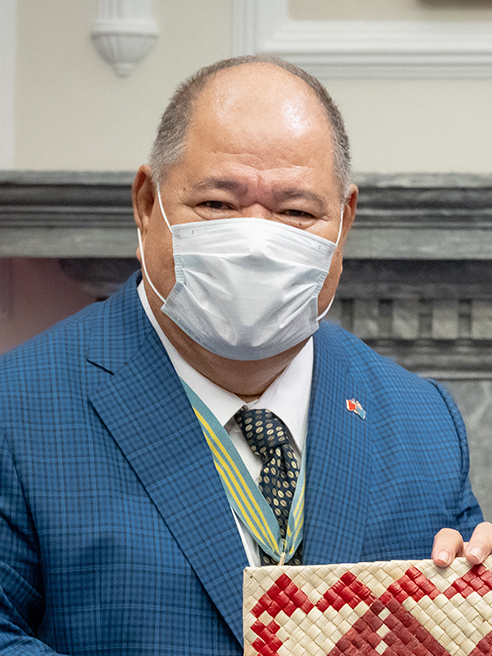
- Paeniu in 2022

3rd Ambassador of Tuvalu to Taiwan
- Incumbent
- Assumed office 1 June 2022
- Preceded by: Limasene Teatu

3rd Prime Minister of Tuvalu
- In office 24 December 1996 – 27 April 1999
- Monarch: Elizabeth II
- Governors-General: Tulaga Manuella; Tomasi Puapua
- Preceded by: Kamuta Latasi
- Succeeded by: Ionatana Ionatana
- In office 16 October 1989 – 10 December 1993
- Monarch: Elizabeth II
- Governors-General: Tupua Leupena; Toaripi Lauti; Tomu Sione
- Preceded by: Tomasi Puapua
- Succeeded by: Kamuta Latasi

Minister of Finance of Tuvalu
- In office 2 August 2002 – 16 August 2006
- Preceded by: Saufatu Sopoanga
- Succeeded by: Lotoala Metia

Personal details
- Born: 10 May 1956 (age 70) Bikenibeu, Gilbert Islands

Bikenibeu Paeniu PC (born 10 May 1956) is a Tuvaluan politician and diplomat who is the current ambassador of Tuvalu to Taiwan. He has served twice as the Prime Minister of Tuvalu and represented the constituency of Nukulaelae in the Parliament of Tuvalu.

== Political career ==
Paeniu made his entrance on the political scene in November 1989, when he won a seat in the Parliament of Tuvalu following a by-election.

=== First premiership ===
Following the 1989 Tuvaluan general election on 27 September 1989, he challenged Prime Minister Tomasi Puapua in the general election and won, becoming the youngest ever Prime Minister of Tuvalu at age 33. Paeniu formed a five-member Cabinet on 16 October 1989, in which he also held the role as foreign minister.

The next general election was held on 25 November 1993. In the subsequent parliament the members were evenly split in their support of Paeniu and Puapua. The subsequent parliament elected Kamuta Latasi as prime minister on 10 December 1993, with a 7 to 5 majority over the group of members of parliament headed by Paeniu.

=== Second premiership ===
Latasi was the prime minister until 24 December 1996. After a motion of no confidence was passed, Latasi resigned and Paeniu was elected as prime minister for the second time. He also held the role of foreign minister.

His second premiership saw a controversy surrounding the design of the national flag of Tuvalu. Paeniu successfully led moves to revert the flag to a previously used design which included the Union Jack. Paeniu is less overtly republican in inclination than Latasi.

On 18 December 1997 the parliament was dissolved and the general election was held on 26 March 1998. Paeniu was re-elected prime minister on 8 April 1998. Paeniu remained as prime minister until he resigned following a motion of no confidence adopted on 27 April 1999 and was succeeded by Ionatana Ionatana.

== Subsequent career ==
Paeniu continued to sit as a Member of Parliament, representing the constituency of Nukulaelae island. In addition, he served as Minister of Finance and Economic Planning in the cabinets of Koloa Talake, Saufatu Sopoanga and Maatia Toafa.

Paeniu lost his seat in the 2006 general election. He faced challenges not only from independent Namoliki Sualiki, but also from his own brother and nephew, Iefata and Luke, who stood against him in his constituency. Bikenibeu Paeniu received 65 votes (ahead of Lukes's 64 and Iefata's 21), but Sualiki was elected with 109.

Paeniu is an alumnus of the University of the South Pacific in Fiji, where he resided as of 2016.

In June 2022, he presented his credentials as ambassador of Tuvalu to Tsai Ing-wen, the president of the Republic of China (Taiwan).

Political offices
Preceded by Tomasi Puapua	Prime Minister of Tuvalu; 1989–1993	Succeeded by Kamuta Latasi
Preceded by Kamuta Latasi	Prime Minister of Tuvalu; 1996–1999	Succeeded by Ionatana Ionatana
Preceded by Saufatu Sopoanga	Minister of Finance of Tuvalu; 2002–2006	Succeeded by Lotoala Metia
