= Ionatana Ionatana =

Prime Minister of Tuvalu from 1999 to 2000

The Right Honourable Ionatana Ionatana CVO OBE CPM
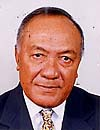

5th Prime Minister of Tuvalu
- In office 27 April 1999 – 8 December 2000
- Monarch: Elizabeth II
- Governor-General: Tomasi Puapua
- Preceded by: Bikenibeu Paeniu
- Succeeded by: Lagitupu Tuilimu (Acting)

Personal details
- Born: 5 November 1938 Funafuti, Gilbert and Ellice Islands (present-day Tuvalu)
- Died: 8 December 2000 (aged 62) Funafuti, Tuvalu

Ionatana Ionatana (5 November 1938 – 8 December 2000) was a political figure from the Pacific nation of Tuvalu. He represented the constituency of Funafuti in the Parliament of Tuvalu. He was the fifth prime minister, and foreign minister, from 27 April 1999 until his death on 8 December 2000.

== Background ==
He joined the police and rose to become the chief of police in 1976. In 1977 he was appointed the government secretary and adviser to the cabinet. On 26 April 1979, he was appointed as the ambassador to the United States (non-resident).

Ionatana was elected to Parliament in the 1981 Tuvalu general election. Ionatana was noted for his republican leanings.

He held three portfolios in the second government of Bikenibeu Paeniu (1996 to 1998): the Minister for Health, Women and Community Affairs; Minister for Education and Culture; and the Minister for Tourism, Trade and Commerce; and after the 1998 election he retained the first 2 portfolios in the 3rd government of Paeniu.

== Prime Minister of Tuvalu ==
In 1999 Ionatana succeeded Bikenibeu Paeniu as Prime Minister of Tuvalu. Ionatana was elected as prime minister on 27 April 1999. Among the prominent issues of his period of office, he oversaw Tuvalu's entry into the United Nations on 5 September 2000. Also during his term, Tuvalu obtained the lucrative .tv internet country suffix.

== Death ==
On 8 December 2000, shortly after the UN entry was completed, Ionatana suddenly collapsed and died. He had been giving a speech at the Vaiaku Lagi Hotel on Funafuti, and was 62 years old. He was the first prime minister to die in office since Tuvalu became independent. After his death Lagitupu Tuilimu took over as acting prime minister until 24 February 2001.

== Honours ==
Ionatana was awarded the Colonial Police Medal (CPM) in the 1974 Birthday Honours.

He was appointed Officer of the Order of the British Empire (OBE) in the 1979 Birthday Honours and Commander of the Royal Victorian Order (CVO) in 1982.

== See also ==
- Foreign relations of Tuvalu

Preceded by Bikenibeu Paeniu	Prime Minister of Tuvalu; 1999–2000	Succeeded by Lagitupu Tuilimu (acting)
