= Faimalaga Luka =

Prime Minister of Tuvalu in 2001

The Right Honourable Faimalaga Luka OBE
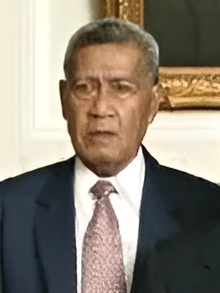
- Luka in 2003

7th Governor-General of Tuvalu
- In office 9 September 2003 – 15 April 2005
- Monarch: Elizabeth II
- Prime Minister: Saufatu Sopoanga; Maatia Toafa
- Preceded by: Tomasi Puapua
- Succeeded by: Filoimea Telito

6th Prime Minister of Tuvalu
- In office 24 February 2001 – 13 December 2001
- Monarch: Elizabeth II
- Governor-General: Tomasi Puapua
- Preceded by: Lagitupu Tuilimu (acting)
- Succeeded by: Koloa Talake

Personal details
- Born: 15 April 1940
- Died: 19 August 2005 (aged 65) Suva, Fiji

Faimalaga Luka, OBE (15 April 1940 – 19 August 2005) was a political figure from the Pacific nation of Tuvalu. He represented the constituency of Nukufetau in the Parliament of Tuvalu. He served as Governor-General and the Prime Minister of Tuvalu.

== Background ==
He was a broadcaster and politician, spending 40 years in the civil service and in politics, serving in roles including Minister for Health from 1994 to 1996 and Minister of Home Affairs from 1999 to 2001. He was married to Sikiona Luka.

In the 1995 New Year Honours, he was appointed an Officer of the Order of the British Empire (OBE) for public service.

== Prime minister ==
After the death of Prime Minister Ionatana on 8 December 2000, Lagitupu Tuilimu was acting prime minister, and foreign minister, from 8 December 2000 to 24 February 2001. Faimalaga Luka became the prime minister, and foreign minister, on 23 February 2001 and was sworn in the next day with a reshuffled cabinet. Luka's government lasted until December 2001, when he lost office as the consequence of a motion of no confidence. On 13 December 2001 the former finance minister Koloa Talake was appointed prime minister.

== Speaker of Parliament ==
In June 2003 he became speaker of parliament, although an opposition MP at the time.

== Governor-General ==
Luka was appointed as Governor-General on 9 September 2003, as the representative of Elizabeth II, Queen of Tuvalu. He retired on 15 April 2005, after reaching his 65th birthday. Tuvalu, unlike most countries, has a mandatory retirement age for all civil servants.

=== Declines a knighthood ===
Luka was the only Governor-General of Tuvalu not to accept a knighthood.

== Death ==
Luka died on 19 August 2005, in Fiji where he had been referred for medical treatment.

== See also ==
- Politics of Tuvalu

Government offices
Preceded by Lagitupu Tuilimu (acting)	Prime Minister of Tuvalu; 2001	Succeeded by Koloa Talake
Preceded by Tomasi Puapua	Governor-General of Tuvalu; 2003–2005	Succeeded by Filoimea Telito
