= Koloa Talake =

Prime Minister of Tuvalu from 2001 to 2002

The Right Honourable Koloa Talake

7th Prime Minister of Tuvalu
- In office 14 December 2001 – 2 August 2002
- Monarch: Elizabeth II
- Governor-General: Tomasi Puapua
- Preceded by: Faimalaga Luka
- Succeeded by: Saufatu Sopoanga

Minister of Finance of Tuvalu
- In office 1993–1996
- Preceded by: Alesana Seluka
- Succeeded by: Alesana Seluka

Personal details
- Born: 7 June 1934 Vaitupu, Gilbert and Ellice Islands
- Died: 26 May 2008 (aged 73) Auckland, New Zealand

Koloa Fineaso Talake (7 June 1934 – 26 May 2008) was a political figure from the Pacific nation of Tuvalu. He represented the constituency of Vaitupu in the Parliament of Tuvalu from 1993. He served as Minister of Finance (1993-1996) and was the prime minister for a short period of time.

Previous to his political career he was the auditor of the Gilbert and Ellice Islands colony (1973-1975), then auditor (1976-1977) and finance secretary (1977-1978) of Tuvalu.

As a member of parliament he moved the vote of no confidence that forced Prime Minister Bikenibeu Paeniu to resign in 1999.

== Prime Minister of Tuvalu ==
Talake served as the seventh Prime Minister of Tuvalu, and Foreign Minister, for nine months, 14 December 2001 – 2 August 2002, after defeating Faimalaga Luka in a vote of no confidence.

Talake was defeated in elections in 2002.

== Significant issues during premiership ==
In that time, he negotiated the sale of that country's Internet domain name, .tv, to an American company in order to bring an income to his resource-poor country.

In 2002, he coordinated an effort, together with the leaders of Kiribati and Maldives to sue the governments of the United States and Australia for failing to ratify the Kyoto Protocol and for their greenhouse gas emissions, which the leaders claimed, resulted in rising sea levels that would eventually flood their countries.

== Succession and later life ==
Talake was not re-elected in the 2002 Tuvaluan general election and was succeeded as Prime Minister of Tuvalu by Saufatu Sopoanga.

Having left office in 2002, Talake relocated to Auckland, New Zealand, where his children were living.

== See also ==
- Politics of Tuvalu

Preceded by Faimalaga Luka	Prime Minister of Tuvalu; 2001-2002	Succeeded by Saufatu Sopoanga
Preceded by Alesana Seluka	Minister of Finance of Tuvalu; 1993–1996	Succeeded by Alesana Seluka
