= Tomasi Puapua =

Prime Minister of Tuvalu from 1981 to 1989

The Right Honourable Sir Tomasi Puapua GCMG KBE

6th Governor-General of Tuvalu
- In office 26 June 1998 – 9 September 2003
- Monarch: Elizabeth II
- Prime Minister: Bikenibeu Paeniu; Ionatana Ionatana; Lagitupu Tuilimu (acting); Faimalaga Luka; Koloa Talake; Saufatu Sopoanga
- Preceded by: Tulaga Manuella
- Succeeded by: Faimalaga Luka

2nd Prime Minister of Tuvalu
- In office 8 September 1981 – 16 October 1989
- Monarch: Elizabeth II
- Governors-General: Fiatau Penitala Teo; Tupua Leupena
- Preceded by: Toaripi Lauti
- Succeeded by: Bikenibeu Paeniu

Personal details
- Born: 10 September 1938 (age 87) Nanumanga, Gilbert and Ellice Islands
- Spouse: Lady Riana Puapua

Sir Tomasi Puapua GCMG KBE (born 10 September 1938) is a political figure who represented Vaitupu in the Parliament of Tuvalu. He attended the Fiji School of Medicine and the Otago University Medical School. He married Riana Puapua.

== Prime minister ==
He was the second Prime Minister of Tuvalu from 8 September 1981 to 16 October 1989. In a country which sees frequent changes among its head of government, Puapua also held the role as foreign minister.

The first elections after independence will not held until 8 September 1981. 26 candidates contested the 12 seats. Puapua was elected as prime minister with a 7:5 majority over the group a members of parliament headed by former Prime Minister Toaripi Lauti. Tomasi Puapua was re-elected in the general election held on 12 September 1985 continued as Prime Minister.

The next general election was held on 26 March 1989. In the subsequent parliament the members elected Bikenibeu Paeniu.

Following the general election that was held on 25 November 1993 the members of parliament were evenly split in their support of the incumbent Prime Minister Bikenibeu Paeniu and Tomasi Puapua. As a consequence, the Governor-General dissolved the parliament on 22 September and a further election took place on 25 November 1993. The subsequent parliament elected Kamuta Latasi as prime minister on 10 December 1993.

== Speaker ==
He was elected Speaker of the Parliament of Tuvalu (Palamene o Tuvalu) during government of Kamuta Latasi from 1993 to 1998.

== Governor-General ==
Having exercised the senior executive office for many years, Puapua later served as Governor-General of Tuvalu as the representative of Elizabeth II, Queen of Tuvalu from 1998 to 2003, which is a higher office in protocol terms, but is more ceremonial in nature.

== Commonwealth honours ==
In the 1998 Birthday Honours, Puapua was appointed a Knight Commander of the Order of the British Empire (KBE) for services to medicine, politics and the community.

In 2002, Puapua was appointed to Knight Grand Cross of the Order of St Michael and St George (GCMG).

Government offices
Preceded by Toaripi Lauti	Prime Minister of Tuvalu; 1981–1989	Succeeded by Bikenibeu Paeniu
Preceded by Sir Tulaga Manuella	Governor-General of Tuvalu; 1998–2003	Succeeded by Faimalaga Luka
