= List of Tuvalu MPs, 2019–2024 =

This is a list of the members of the Parliament of Tuvalu or Palamene o Tuvalu as elected at the 2019 Tuvaluan general election.

There are no formal parties in Tuvalu. The political system is based on personal alliances and loyalties derived from clan and family connections. The Parliament of Tuvalu is rare among national legislatures in that it is non-partisan in nature. It does tend to have both a distinct government and a distinct opposition.

Members elected for the first time at the 2019 general election are noted with *

Name	National party	Constituency	# of votes	# Notes
Isaia Taape	Independent	Vaitupu	494	
Nielu Meisake *	Independent	Vaitupu	642	
Monise Lafai	Independent	Nanumaga	366	
Minute Alapati Taupo *	Independent	Nanumaga	361	Died 23 May 2022
Simon Kofe	Independent	Funafuti	374	
Kausea Natano	Independent	Funafuti	355	
Katepu Laoi *	Independent	Niutao	328	Died in April 2022.
Samuelu Teo	Independent	Niutao	235	
Fatoga Talama *	Independent	Nukufetau	323	
Enele Sopoaga	Independent	Nukufetau	491	
Namoliki Sualiki	Independent	Nukulaelae	182	
Seve Paeniu *	Independent	Nukulaelae	199	
Mackenzie Kiritome	Independent	Nui	249	
Puakena Boreham	Independent	Nui	274	
Ampelosa Manoa Tehulu *	Independent	Nanumea	603	
Timi Melei *	Independent	Nanumea	327	

== By-elections ==
Saaga Talu Teafa was elected in June 2022 to represent Niutao following the death of Katepu Laoi in April 2022.

Following the death of Minute Alapati Taupo on 23 May 2022, the Reverend Dr Kitiona Tausi was elected to represent Nanumaga in the by-election held on 15 July 2022. Tausi, who had been the chairman of the Tuvalu Broadcasting Corporation Board of Directors, received 240 votes, beating Hamoa Holona who received 199 votes, and Alapati Rick Minute Taupo who received 179 votes.

Panapasi Nelesoni was elected to represent Nukufetau in June 2023 to replace Fatoga Talama, following his death.

Preceded by List of Tuvalu MPs, 2015–2019	Parliament of Tuvalu; 2019 general election	Succeeded by List of Tuvalu MPs elected in 2024
