= List of Tuvalu MPs, 2002–2006 =

This is a list of members of the Parliament of Tuvalu or Palamene o Tuvalu who were elected at the 2002 Tuvaluan general election. or as the result of by elections during the life of the parliament.

There are no formal parties in Tuvalu. The political system is based on personal alliances and loyalties derived from clan and family connections. The Parliament of Tuvalu is rare among national legislatures in that it is non-partisan in nature. It does tend to have both a distinct government and a distinct opposition.

On 14 August 2006 Apisai Ielemia was elected as Prime Minister of Tuvalu; and appointed his cabinet.

Constituency	Members	Notes
Funafuti	Kausea Natano	
Funafuti	Kamuta Latasi	
Nanumaga	Otinielu Tausi	
Nanumaga	Namoto Kelisiano	Resigned in order to run the island's power plant at the request of his home community.
Nanumaga	Halo Tuavai	Elected in 2005 by-election.
Nanumea	Maatia Toafa	
Nanumea	Sio Patiale	Elected at the 2003 by-election that was held because of a procedural flaw in the initial election.
Nanumea	Kokea Malua	Elected in 2005 by-election after Sio Patiale resigned due to ill health.
Niutao	Samuelu Teo	
Niutao	Saloa Tauia	Died in 2003.
Niutao	Tavau Teii	Elected in 2003 by-election.
Nui	Dr. Alesana Seluka	
Nui	Amasone Kilei	Died in 2005.
Nui	Taom Tanukale	Elected in 2005 by-election.
Nukufetau	Saufatu Sopoanga	Resigned following motion of no confidence as Prime Minister. Re-elected in 2004 by-election.
Nukufetau	Faimalaga Luka	Appointed Governor General in 2003.
Nukufetau	Elisala Pita	Elected in 2003 by-election.
Nukulaelae	Bikenibeu Paeniu	
Vaitupu	Apisai Ielemia	
Vaitupu	Leti Pelesala	

Preceded by List of Tuvalu MPs, 1998–2002	Parliament of Tuvalu; 2002–2006	Succeeded by List of Tuvalu MPs, 2006–2010
