= List of Tuvalu MPs, 2015–2019 =

This is a list of members of the Parliament of Tuvalu or Palamene o Tuvalu who were elected at the 2015 Tuvaluan general election or as the result of by-elections during the life of the parliament.

There are no formal parties in Tuvalu. The political system is based on personal alliances and loyalties derived from clan and family connections. The Parliament of Tuvalu is rare among national legislatures in that it is non-partisan in nature. It does tend to have both a distinct government and a distinct opposition.

The general election was held in Tuvalu on 31 March 2015. The state of emergency created by Cyclone Pam resulted in the election being delayed twice. The election was originally scheduled for 19 March, then after Cyclone Pam caused damage to the islands, the election was rescheduled.

The constituencies of Niutao and Nui had contested ballots, including former members of parliament as candidates. On Nui the sitting members were not returned to parliament. On Nuitao Vete Sakaio, the deputy-prime minister, was not elected; the election was otherwise a good result for the government of Enele Sopoaga, who expects to have the support of 11 members of parliament. Enele Sopoaga was sworn in as prime minister and appointed the ministers to the cabinet on 10 April.

Members elected for the first time at the 2015 general election are noted with *

Name	National party	Constituency	# Notes
Taukelina Finikaso	Independent	Vaitupu	
Apisai Ielemia	Independent	Vaitupu	The High Court declared that Ielemia was not qualified to be a member of parliament.
Isaia Vaipuna Taape *	Independent	Vaitupu	Elected at the Vaitupu by-election.
Monise Lafai	Independent	Nanumaga	
Otinielu Tausi	Independent	Nanumaga	Elected Speaker of the Parliament of Tuvalu.
Sir Kamuta Latasi	Independent	Funafuti	Sir Kamuta Latasi resigned as MP on 17 October 2018.
Simon Kofe *	Independent	Funafuti	Kofe was elected at the Funafuti by-election on 20 November 2018.
Kausea Natano	Independent	Funafuti	
Fauoa Maani	Independent	Niutao	
Samuelu Teo *	Independent	Niutao	
Elisala Pita	Independent	Nukufetau	Elected unopposed
Enele Sopoaga	Independent	Nukufetau	Elected unopposed
Namoliki Sualiki	Independent	Nukulaelae	Elected unopposed
Mackenzie Kiritome *	Independent	Nui	
Puakena Boreham *	Independent	Nui	
Satini Manuella	Independent	Nanumea	
Maatia Toafa	Independent	Nanumea	

== Vaitupu by-election, 2017 ==
Apisai Ielemia was elected to represent Vaitupu in the Tuvaluan general election, 2015. On 5 October 2016 Chief Justice Sweeney of the High Court of Tuvalu declared that Ielemia's parliamentary seat was vacant as he was no longer qualified to be a member of parliament, as the consequence of the short time the opposition MP served time in jail following his conviction on 6 May 2016 in the Magistrate's Court of charges of abuse of office during the final year of his term as Prime Minister (August 2006 to September 2010).

The Vaitupu by-election was held on 17 July 2017. Isaia Vaipuna Taape was elected with about half the 1,100 votes, 41 votes ahead of Melton Paka Tauetia. Taape was sworn in as a member of parliament for Vaitupu on Wednesday 16 August 2017.

== Funafuti by-election, 2018 ==
Sir Kamuta Latasi resigned as MP on 17 October 2018. A by-election was held on 20 November 2018, with Simon Kofe, a former senior magistrate, being elected.

Preceded by List of Tuvalu MPs, 2010–2015	Parliament of Tuvalu; 2015–2019	Succeeded by List of Tuvalu MPs, 2019–2024
