= List of Tuvalu MPs, 2006–2010 =

This is a list of members of the Parliament of Tuvalu or Palamene o Tuvalu as elected at the 2006 Tuvaluan general election:

There are no formal parties in Tuvalu. The political system is based on personal alliances and loyalties derived from clan and family connections. The Parliament of Tuvalu is rare among national legislatures in that it is non-partisan in nature. It does tend to have both a distinct government and a distinct opposition.

Apisai Ielemia was appointed to be the Prime Minister of Tuvalu; and appointed his cabinet.

Name	Constituency	First elected
Taukelina Finikaso	Vaitupu	2006
Apisai Ielemia	Vaitupu	2002
Sir Kamuta Latasi	Funafuti	1992
Lotoala Metia	Nukufetau	2006
Kausea Natano	Funafuti	2002
Elisala Piita	Nukufetau	2003
Falesa Pitoi	Nanumaga	2006
Dr. Alesana Seluka	Nui	2006
Sir Tomu Sione	Niutao	1977-2002; 2006
Namoliki Sualiki	Nukulaelae	2006
Italeli Taeia	Nui	2006
Otinielu Tausi	Nanumaga	1993
Tavau Teii	Niutao	2003
Willy Telavi	Nanumea	2006
Maatia Toafa	Nanumea	2002

Preceded by List of Tuvalu MPs, 2002–2006	Parliament of Tuvalu; 2006–2010	Succeeded by List of Tuvalu MPs, 2010–2015
