= Teleke Lauti =

Tuvaluan pastor and politician

The Reverend Teleke Lauti

Member of Parliament
- In office 26 March 1998 – 25 July 2002 Serving with Ionatana Ionatana
- Succeeded by: Kausea Natano
- Constituency: Funafuti

Personal details
- Political party: Independent
- Relatives: Toaripi Lauti

Teleke Peleti Lauti is a Tuvaluan pastor and politician who served as a member of the Parliament of Tuvalu from 1998 to 2002. The nephew of the country's first Prime Minister, Toaripi Lauti, he represented Funafuti in the parliament and served as reverend of the Church of Tuvalu. As an MP, he was Tuvalu's Minister for the Environment and was active in the climate movement, serving as a representative at a United Nations Climate Change Conference.

== Biography ==
Lauti is from Funafuti and is the nephew of Toaripi Lauti, the first Prime Minister of Tuvalu. He comes from the Malugata and Vaitafe family clans. He attended Pacific Theological College in Suva, Fiji, and later returned to Tuvalu, where he became a reverend for the Church of Tuvalu.

In July 1982, Lauti was appointed by the Governor-General as a clerk for the Tuvalu Public Service Commission. He later served as a Conservation Area Support Officer (CASO). Lauti became active in the climate movement, advocating for reforms to help stop the effects of climate change in Tuvalu. In 1997, he attended the 6th South Pacific Conference on Nature Conservation & Protected Areas in Pohnpei, Federated States of Micronesia, authoring a work on Community-based conservation and challenges of urban population in Funafuti.

In 1998, Lauti ran for election to the Parliament of Tuvalu to be one of the two representatives of Funafuti. He ran as an independent, as Tuvalu does not have a party system. His campaign was managed by his uncle, former Prime Minister and head of the Vaitafe family clan, Toaripi Lauti. He was elected alongside Ionatana Ionatana and unseated the incumbent, former Prime Minister Kamuta Latasi, in a significant upset. His victory over Latasi was attributed to the Lauti family's prominence in Funafuti, his uncle's good campaign management, and the presence of a third candidate, Elia Taufita, drawing votes from Latasi.

As an MP for Tuvalu, Lauti served as a Special Ministerial Adviser in the Ministry of National Resources and was the Minister for the Environment. In 2000, the same year Tuvalu was admitted to the United Nations, Lauti was a Tuvaluan representative at the United Nations Climate Change Conference in The Hague, the Netherlands. There, he pleaded with the nations drafting the Kyoto Protocol. In a statement at the conference, he said:

The sea is our very close neighbour. In fact, on the island where I live, Funafuti, it is possible to throw a stone from one side of the island to the other. Our islands are very low lying. When a cyclone hits us there is no place to escape. We cannot climb any mountains or move away to take refuge. It is hard to describe the effects of a cyclonic storm surge when it washes right across our islands. I would not want to wish this experience on anyone. The devastation is beyond description ... This concern is so serious for our people, that the Cabinet, in which I am a member, has been exploring the possibility of buying land in a near-by country, in case we become refugees to the impacts of climate change.

Following his four-year term as an MP, Lauti was unseated in the 2002 Tuvaluan general election, finishing with 149 votes, while Kamuta Latasi won 373 and future Prime Minister Kausea Natano 364. Afterwards, he served as a pastor on the island of Nanumaga. In 2010, he authored a book, titled Breaking Through the Wall: The Coming of the Church to Nanumaga. He was interviewed by Australia's ABC News on the effects of climate change in 2011. In 2018, after the resignation of Kamuta Latasi as an MP, Lauti ran for election in the Funafuti by-election, coming in fourth, with Simon Kofe winning. As of 2021, he was serving on the Kaupule of Funafuti, the executive branch of the island's assembly of elders.
