= Amasone Kilei =

Tuvaluan politician

Amasone Kilei MBE

Member of the Tuvaluan Parliament for Nui.
- In office 7 December 2000 – 2005
- Succeeded by: Taom Tanukale

Personal details
- Died: 2005
- Party: Independent

Amasone Kilei was a Tuvaluan politician who represented Nui. He was appointed the Minister of Health and the Minister of Education, Sports and Culture, in the government of Lagitupu Tuilimu, who was acting prime minister from 8 December 2000 to 24 February 2001.

In 1992, Amasone Kilei was the Deputy Secretary to the Government. In the 1998 New Year Honours, Kelei was appointed a Member of the Order of the British Empire (MBE) for public service and services to the community and education.

== Political career ==
The Electoral Provisions (Parliament) Act of Tuvalu was amended in May 2000 to increase the membership of parliament from 12 to 15 MPs. Kilei was elected in a special election in November 2000, (together with Saufatu Sopoanga and Namoto Kelisiano) and they attended their first parliamentary session on 7 December 2000. Kilei was re-elected in the 2002 general election. Following the general election, Saufatu Sopoanga, became prime minister in August 2002, defeating Kilei by 8 votes to 7, and Kilei became the leader of the opposition. It was expected that Tuvalu would have a period of political stability. However the Sopoanga government lost its majority in May 2003, following the results of the 2003 Nanumea by-election and the 2003 Niutao by-election.

As leader of the opposition, Kilei wrote to the governor-general on 10 May 2003 advising that he commanded the support of a majority of the members of parliament and they were ready to form a government. On 20 June 2003, Kilei commenced an action in the High Court of Tuvalu seeking order regarding the appointment of a speaker and the calling of parliament. As it happened, the governor-general had, on 19 June 2003, issued a notice for the meeting to elect a speaker. In June 2003 opposition MP Faimalaga Luka became speaker of parliament. However parliament was not called. On 6 August 2003 the High Court declined to make the declaration that the prime minister must resign; however the Chief Justice delivered directions as to how the governor-general should proceed to take any action the governor-general considers to be appropriate under Section 116(1) of the Constitution of Tuvalu, acting in his or her own deliberate judgment, rather than as advised by the Cabinet of Tuvalu. That is, the governor-general could consider whether it was appropriate to exercise their reserve powers in calling parliament.

On 9 September Sopoanga arranged the appointment Faimalaga Luka as governor general, depriving the opposition of its crucial one-seat majority and triggering the 2003 Nukufetau by-election. The winner of the October by-election, Elisala Pita, joined the government's benches, enabling it to survive a while longer. The Sopoanga government was eventually brought down by an eight-to-six motion of no confidence in August 2004. Maatia Toafa was elected prime minister on 11 October 2004 with a vote of 8:7. Kilei died in 2005.
