= Second Toafa Ministry =

12th ministry of the Government of Tuvalu

- 12th Cabinet of Tuvalu
- Date formed: 29 September 2010
- Date dissolved: 24 December 2010

People and organisations
- Head of state: Queen Elizabeth II (represented by Sir Iakoba Italeli)
- Head of government: Maatia Toafa
- Deputy head of government: Enele Sopoaga
- Member party: Independent
- Opposition leader: None

History
- Election: 2010
- Predecessor: Ielemia Ministry
- Successor: Telavi Ministry

The Second Toafa Ministry was the 12th ministry of the Government of Tuvalu, led by Prime Minister Maatia Toafa.

It succeeded the Ielemia Ministry, which was voted out of office after the 2010 election.

The Second Toafa Ministry was sworn in by Governor-General Sir Iakoba Italeli on 29 September 2010. However the ministry had a short term in office as the Prime Minister and his ministry was brought down by the opposition's vote of no confidence, and as a result, was succeeded by the Telavi Ministry, led by Willy Telavi, who was appointed as prime minister on 24 December 2010 after crossing the floor to bring down the government.

== Cabinet ==
Officeholder	Office(s)
Maatia Toafa MP	Prime Minister
Enele Sopoaga MP	Deputy Prime Minister; Minister of Foreign Affairs, the Environment and Labour
Namoliki Sualiki MP	Minister for Education, Youth and Sport
Taukelina Finikaso MP	Minister of Communication, Transport and Fisheries
Monise Laafai MP	Minister of Finance
Fauoa Maani MP	Minister for Health
Vete Sakaio MP	Minister for Works and Natural Resources
Willy Telavi MP	Minister for Home Affairs
