= 2013 Nukufetau by-election =

Tuvalu by-election in 2013

- 28 June 2013
Candidate	Elisala Pita	Petely Niuatui
Party	Independent	Independent
Alliance	Opposition	Government
Popular vote	537	264
Percentage	67.04%	32.96%
MP before election
Lotoala Metia
Independent
Elected MP
Elisala Pita
Independent

A by-election was held in the Nukufetau constituency in Tuvalu on 28 June 2013. It followed the death of MP and Minister for Finance Lotoala Metia, who died suddenly on 21 December 2012.

The by-election ultimately played a key part in an unprecedented constitutional crisis, culminating in a change of government.

== Context ==
The by-election was seen as crucial for the future of Prime Minister Willy Telavi's government, which was reduced by Metia's death to a parity of seven seats apiece with the Opposition in Parliament. The government had previously survived a by-election in August 2011 caused by the death of Minister for Works Isaia Italeli.

Nukufetau is a two-seat constituency. In the 2010 general election, it had returned Enele Sopoaga and Lotoala Metia, respectively with 40.46% and 32.95% of the vote, ahead of one other candidate (incumbent Elisala Pita). For the by-election, of course, only one seat would be provided for, Sopoaga (the Leader of the Opposition) retaining the other.

By early February 2013, no date had been set for the Nukufetau by-election, prompting the opposition to accuse the government of unnecessary (and potentially unconstitutional) delay. Tensions were reported on Nukufetau between supporters of the government and supporters of the opposition, with fears of violence, accentuating calls that the election should be decided swiftly. The opposition was campaigning actively for the seat, before the by-election had even been called. Nukufetau's council of elders (Falekaupule) reportedly backed the opposition, as they had been doing for a while; in 2011, the elders had unsuccessfully asked Metia to "reconsider his allegiance" to Telavi, and to support Sopoaga instead. By mid-March, the government had still not set a date for the by-election, and Opposition MP Taukelina Finikaso accused the Telavi government of having shelved a water supply project on Nukufetau, so as to punish the atoll for its elders' lack of political support.

At the start of April, Finikaso lodged a claim in the High Court of Tuvalu, seeking an injunction to compel the government to proceed with the by-election. He argued that the government was afraid of losing its majority through the by-election, Parliament not having sat since Metia's death had rendered the seat vacant in December. Prime Minister Telavi responded that he wished to see the tensions on Nukufetau resolved before a by-election was held. He pointed to "a number of officials" having been dismissed by the local council, identifying this as a source of tension and division, and called for reconciliation before the election. He stated that the dismissal of officials, which he described as "wrongful", led him to doubt whether the election would be "free and fair"; hence the delay, he explained.

In May, complications emerged in relation to the court hearing due to rule on Finikaso's claim. Tuvalu's Chief Justice Sir Gordon Ward was a resident of New Zealand; to reach Tuvalu, he had to transit via Fiji. (The only flights to Funafuti International Airport are from Fiji.) He had formerly served as President of Fiji's Court of Appeal, but had resigned following the 2006 Fijian coup d'état; he had then criticised Fiji's military government. The Fiji government refused him transit, stating that Tuvaluan authorities had not "submitted the proper paperwork in time". Ward then offered to hear the case in New Zealand, which Finikaso accepted. The Tuvalu High Court ruling was issued in Auckland on 24 May, ordering that the by-election must be held within twenty-six days. The government then announced the election would be held on 28 June 2013.

== Candidates ==
The government nominated Petely Niuatui, a teacher. Were she to be elected, she would be only the third woman ever to be elected to the Tuvaluan Parliament, which for the first time ever would have two female MPs simultaneously.

Two candidates were "nominated by the Nukufetau community with a strong Opposition backing", with the understanding that one or the other would withdraw. One was Saufatu Sopoaga, former Prime Minister (2002-2004) and elder brother of the other sitting Nukufetau MP, Opposition leader Enele Sopoaga. The other was Elisala Pita, formerly an MP for the constituency from the 2003 by-election until his defeat in the 2010 general election. It was eventually decided that Pita would be the Opposition's candidate.

== Result and consequences ==
Pita won the seat by a landslide, with over two-thirds of the vote. The Opposition now had a majority of seats (eight to seven), and immediately called for the government to reconvene Parliament, which had not sat since Metia's death in December. A constitutional crisis developed when Prime Minister Telavi responded that, under the Constitution, he was only required to convene Parliament once a year, and was thus under no obligation to summon it until December 2013. Tuvalu's opposition then requested the Governor-General Iakoba Italeli to intervene against the Prime Minister's decision. On 3 July, Italeli exercised his reserve powers in ordering Parliament to convene, against the Prime Minister's wishes, on 30 July.

On 30 July 2013, as the government was about to face a motion of no confidence, Health Minister Taom Tanukale unexpectedly resigned from Parliament (and thus also from the government) altogether. With Metia dead, Education Minister Falesa Pitoi ill and outside the country since December 2012, and Tanukale having resigned, this left Telavi with only three active government ministers other than himself: Deputy Prime Minister Kausea Natano, Foreign Affairs Minister Apisai Ielemia, and Home Affairs Minister Pelenike Isaia; he also had the support of the Speaker. (There were no government backbenchers.) The following day, the reason for Tanukale's resignation became apparent. The Speaker, Kamuta Latasi, rejected the Opposition's attempt to table a motion of no confidence, on the grounds that there was now a vacant seat in Parliament. Latasi adjourned Parliament, and ruled that it would not reconvene until a by-election had been held - thus prolonging Telavi's minority government once more.

Ultimately, on 1 August Governor General Sir Iakoba Italeli intervened to remove Prime Minister Telavi from office, so as to enable Parliament to sit and determine who was to form a government. Parliament elected Opposition Leader Enele Sopoaga to the premiership.

Nukufetau by-election, 2013
Party	Candidate	Votes	%	±%
Independent	Elisala Pita (opposition candidate)	537	67.04	+40.45
Independent	Petely Niuatui (government candidate)	264	32.96	n/a
Majority		273	34.08	
Opposition gain from Government				

== 2010 result ==
Nukufetau constituency results
Party	Candidate	Votes	%	±%
Nonpartisan	Enele Sopoaga	490	40.46	
Nonpartisan	Lotoala Metia	399	32.95	
Nonpartisan	Elisala Pita	322	26.59	
Lotoala Metia hold		Swing		
Enele Sopoaga gain from Elisala Pita				

== See also ==
- List of by-elections in Tuvalu
