= Telavi Ministry =

13th ministry of the Government of Tuvalu

- 13th Cabinet of Tuvalu

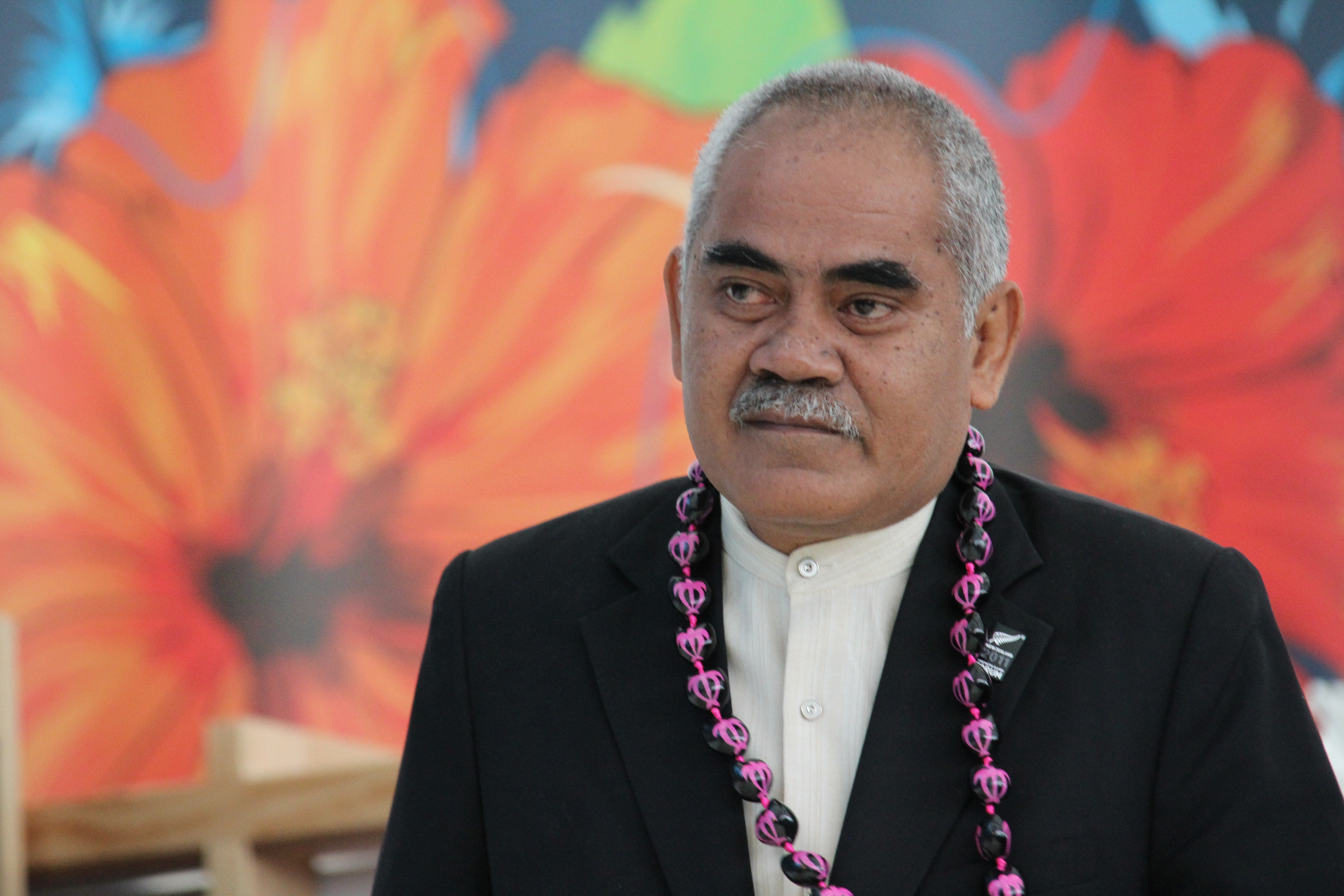
- Date formed: 24 December 2010
- Date dissolved: 2 August 2013

People and organisations
- Head of state: Queen Elizabeth II (represented by Sir Iakoba Italeli)
- Head of government: Willy Telavi
- Deputy head of government: Kausea Natano
- Member party: Independent
- Opposition leader: Enele Sopoaga

History
- Election: 2010
- Predecessor: Second Toafa Ministry
- Successor: Sopoaga Ministry

The Telavi Ministry was the 13th ministry of the Government of Tuvalu, led by Prime Minister Willy Telavi. It succeeded the Second Toafa Ministry upon its swearing in by Governor-General Iakoba Italeli on 24 December 2010 after a vote of no confidence in former Prime Minister Maatia Toafa. Following Telavi's removal as prime minister, his ministry was subsequently brought down by the opposition's vote of no confidence and was succeeded by the Sopoaga Ministry, led by Enele Sopoaga, on 5 August 2013.

== Cabinet ==
Officeholder	Office(s)
Willy Telavi MP	Prime Minister; Minister for Home Affairs (until July 2011); Minister for Works and Natural Resources (from July 2011)
Kausea Natano MP	Deputy Prime Minister; Minister for Communications, Transport and Public Utilities
Dr. Falesa Pitoi MP	Minister for Education, Youth and Sport
Apisai Ielemia MP	Minister for the Environment, Foreign Affairs, Labour, Trade and Tourism
Lotoala Metia MP	Minister of Finance (until December 2012)
Taom Tanukale MP	Minister for Health (until July 2013)
Isaia Italeli MP	Minister for Works and Natural Resources (until July 2011)
Pelenike Isaia MP	Minister for Home Affairs (from July 2011)

== Changes to the Ministry ==
=== 2011 changes ===
Isaia Italeli, Minister for Works and Natural Resources, died suddenly on 19 July 2011, while attending a regional meeting in Apia, Samoa. In August, his widow, Pelenike Isaia, was elected to his seat in Parliament in a by-election in the constituency of Nui, thereby saving the government's parliamentary majority. She was subsequently appointed to Cabinet as Minister for Home Affairs. She is the second woman in Parliament, and in Cabinet, in Tuvalu's history. Prime Minister Telavi took on the role of Minister for Works and Natural Resources.

=== 2012 changes ===
On 21 December 2012, Finance Minister Lotoala Metia died in turn, in hospital, of unspecified causes. As a by-election was not called until June 2013, he was not replaced.

=== 2013 changes ===
Health Minister Taom Tanukale resigned unexpectedly from government on 30 July, when parliament was reconvened by the governor-general. Telavi's ministry was subsequently voted out of office three days later thus he was not replaced.
