= Natano Ministry =

- 15th Cabinet of Tuvalu
- Date formed: 20 September 2019

People and organisations
- Head of state: Queen Elizabeth II (20 September 2019 – 8 September 2022); King Charles III (8 September 2022 – present) (represented by the Rev. Sir Tofiga Vaevalu Falani)
- Head of government: Kausea Natano
- Deputy head of government: Minute Alapati Taupo (20 September 2019 – 23 May 2022); Kitiona Tausi (from July 2022 to February 2024)
- Member party: Independent
- Opposition leader: None

History
- Election: 2019 Tuvaluan general election
- Predecessor: Sopoaga Ministry
- Successor: Teo Ministry

The Natano Ministry was the 15th ministry of the Government of Tuvalu, led by Prime Minister Kausea Natano. It succeeded the Sopoaga Ministry upon its swearing in by the acting Governor-General, Mrs. Teniku Talesi Honolulu, on 18 September 2019.

Natano served as a Minister for Public Utilities and Industries in the Ielemia Ministry (2006-2010); and he was Deputy Prime Minister and Minister for Communications, Transport and Public Utilities in the Telavi Ministry (2010–2013).

== Cabinet ==
Mrs. Teniku Talesi Honolulu, the acting Governor-General of Tuvalu convened the Parliament of Tuvalu to meet on 19 September 2019, at which Kausea Natano was elected as Prime Minister of Tuvalu. Natano appointed the members of the Cabinet, which met for the first time on 20 September 2019.

Portfolio	Minister	Constituency	Notes
Prime Minister	Kausea Natano	Funafuti	
Deputy Prime Minister & Minister of Fisheries & Trade	Minute Alapati Taupo	Nanumaga	Died 23 May 2022.
Deputy Prime Minister & Minister of Fisheries & Trade	Kitiona Tausi	Nanumaga	Elected in the by-election held on 15 July 2022 and then appointed to the cabinet.
Minister for Justice, Communication & Foreign Affairs	Simon Kofe	Funafuti	Kofe resigned in July 2023 to focus on the parliamentary work to amend the Constitution.
Minister for Justice, Communication & Foreign Affairs	Panapasi Nelesoni	Nukufetau	Appointed in August 2023.
Minister for Education, Youth & Sports	Timi Melei	Nanumea	
Minister for Public Utilities & Environment	Ampelosa Manoa Tehulu	Nanumea	
Minister of Finance	Seve Paeniu	Nukulaelae	
Minister for Health, Social Welfare & Gender	Isaia Taape	Vaitupu	
Minister for Home Affairs & Agriculture	Katepu Laoi	Niutao	Died in April 2022.
Minister for Home Affairs & Agriculture	Sa'aga Talu Teafa	Niutao	Won the Niutao by-election on 6 June 2022 following the death of Katepu Laoi.
Minister for Transport, Energy & Tourism	Nielu Meisake	Vaitupu	
