= Minute Alapati Taupo =

Tuvaluan politician (1962–2022)

The Honourable Minute Alapati Taupo OBE
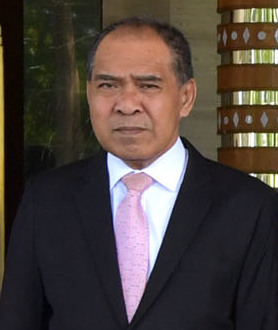
- Taupo in 2020

Deputy Prime Minister & Minister for Fisheries and Trade
- In office September 2019 – 23 May 2022
- Prime Minister: Kausea Natano
- Preceded by: Maatia Toafa (Deputy Prime Minister) Puakena Boreham (Fisheries) Taukelina Finikaso (Trade)

Member of Parliament
- In office September 2019 – 23 May 2022
- Constituency: Nanumanga

1st Tuvalu Ambassador to Taiwan
- In office February 2013 – March 2017
- Succeeded by: Limasene Teatu

Personal details
- Born: 1 February 1962 Gilbert and Ellice Islands (present day Tuvalu)
- Died: 23 May 2022 (aged 60) Nui, Tuvalu
- Party: Independent
- Spouse: Seleta Kapua Taupo
- Children: 3 children and 6 grandchildren
- Education: University of Sydney; Loughborough University; University of the South Pacific

Minute Alapati Taupo (1 February 1962 – 23 May 2022) was a Tuvaluan politician, diplomat, economist and accountant. Taupo was elected to the Parliament of Tuvalu in the 2019 Tuvaluan general election to represent the Nanumanga electorate. He was appointed Deputy Prime Minister & Minister for Fisheries and Trade in the Natano Ministry.

== Education ==
Taupo graduated from Loughborough University of Technology (now known as Loughborough University) in Leicestershire, United Kingdom, with a Postgraduate Diploma degree in Cooperative Management & Development in 1988. In 1995, he completed a Bachelor of Arts degree in Economics and Accounting & Financial Management at the University of the South Pacific in Fiji. He later earned a Master of Commerce degree in Finance (with Banking) in 2001 from the University of Sydney in Australia.

== Civil service ==
He began work as a Bank Officer for the National Bank of Tuvalu in 1983. In 1986, he became the Co-operatives & Trade Officer in the Ministry of Finance and Public Corporations. From 1990 to 1995, he was appointed to represent the Pacific Small Island States to the Tourism Council of the South Pacific (now known as South Pacific Tourism Organisation) Management Board.

In 1995, he was promoted to Assistant Secretary for the Ministry of Finance and Economic Planning before he became the Acting Permanent Secretary in 1996. During his tenure, he was chairman of the National Bank of Tuvalu Board, Development Bank of Tuvalu Board, Tuvalu National Provident Fund Board, National Coinage Security Committee, Tuvalu Public Tenders Board, and the Vaiaku Lagi Hotel Board. He was also a Director of the Foreign Investment Facilitating Board, Tuvalu Electricity Corporation Board, and the Tuvalu Philatelic Bureau Board. Taupo was the Registrar of Companies and Co-operative Societies, and Tuvalu's Deputy National Authorizing Officer for the European Union Funds.

Later in 1996, he was transferred to serve as Acting Permanent Secretary for the Ministry of Tourism, Trade, and Commerce.

In 1997, he was posted to the Tuvalu High Commission in Fiji as First Secretary. He was promoted to Deputy High Commissioner in 1999. Taupo returned to Tuvalu in 2002 to serve as Senior Assistant Secretary in the Office of the Prime Minister. He resumed diplomatic duties for Tuvalu in late 2002, when he was appointed his country's Minister-Counsellor and Deputy Permanent Representative to the United Nations. The newly established Permanent Mission in New York represented Tuvalu to the UN and supported its leading role as Vice-Chairman of the Alliance of Small Island States (AOSIS).

In late 2006, Taupo became the Permanent Secretary for the Ministry of Natural Resources, Lands and Environment. He was Tuvalu's focal-point for Global Environment Facility (GEF), SPREP, SOPAC, FAO, Forum Fisheries Agency (FFA) and Western and Central Pacific Fisheries Commission (WCPFC). Taupo was a member of the Development Coordinating Committee of the Tuvalu Government, and chairman of the Sub-Committee of the Parties to the Nauru Agreement.

In 2008, he was transferred to serve as the Permanent Secretary for the Ministry of Education, Youth and Sports. Taupo was chairman of the National Scholarship Committee, Committee of the University of the South Pacific Extension Services in Tuvalu, and Tuvalu Maritime Training School Board. He was also Tuvalu's representative to the South Pacific Board for Educational Assessment, and a member of the Development Coordinating Committee of the Tuvalu Government.

In 2009, he was appointed Permanent Secretary for the Ministry of Finance and Economic Development. During his tenure, he served as Tuvalu's Alternate Governor to the World Bank, International Monetary Fund, and Asian Development Bank. Taupo was also chairman of the National Bank of Tuvalu Board, Development Bank of Tuvalu Board, National Coinage Security Committee, Tuvalu Public Tenders Board, Price Control Board, Macroeconomic Policy Committee, and Core Budget Committee. Additionally, he served as Alternate Chairman of the Tuvalu Trust Fund Board, a Director of the Foreign Investment Facilitating Board, and a member of the Development Coordinating Committee of the Tuvalu Government. Taupo was also Tuvalu's National Authorizing Officer for the EU Fund, and Registrar of Companies and Co-operative Societies. Occasionally, he was acting Secretary to Government.

Taupo was posted to the Republic of China (Taiwan) in 2013 as Ambassador Extraordinary and Plenipotentiary, entrusted with the task of establishing the Embassy of Tuvalu in Taipei. He presented his credentials to the President of the Republic of China Ma Ying-jeou on 14 March 2013. He was the founder of the Pacific Small Island Developing States (PSIDS) Group of Missions where he was appointed its first Secretary-General and later elected as Dean in 2016 to represent the entire group (consisting of Tuvalu, Nauru, Solomon Islands, Palau, Kiribati, Marshall Islands, Fiji and Papua New Guinea) on matters of diplomatic privilege and protocol. Ambassador Taupo was a member of the Executive of the Diplomatic Corps in Taiwan. He also represented Tuvalu at the Ministerial Conference on Regional Economic Cooperation and Integration in Asia and the Pacific in 2013.

== Political career ==
Taupo was elected to the Parliament of Tuvalu in the 2019 Tuvaluan general election to represent the Nanumanga electorate. He was appointed Deputy Prime Minister and Minister for Fisheries and Trade in the Natano Ministry. He has actively represented Tuvalu in various Ministerial meetings, high-level dialogues, and negotiations. In September 2019, he led the delegation of the newly formed government to the United Nations (UN) General Assembly 74th Session and delivered Tuvalu's statement.

== Death ==
Taupo was invited as a guest of honour to commemorate the 100th anniversary of the founding of a chapel on the island of Nui. Soon after delivering his remarks, Taupo collapsed in the meeting hall and died.

== Honours ==
Taupo was appointed Officer of the Order of the British Empire (OBE) in the 2019 New Year Honours for contribution to public services.
