= 2003 Nanumea by-election =

By-election in Tuvalu

- 5 May 2003

One of the two Nanumea seats in the Parliament of Tuvalu. Elected by simple majority using first past the post.
Candidate	Sio Patiale	Lopati Tefoa	Lagitupu Tuilimu
Party	Independent	Independent	Independent
Popular vote	414	190	98
Percentage	58.97%	27.07%	13.96%

A by-election was held in the Nanumea constituency in Tuvalu on 5 May 2003. It was triggered by the annulment in February of incumbent MP Sio Patiale's election in the July 2002 general election. Patiale was found by the country's High Court of Tuvalu to have "lodged his nomination papers after the legal deadline", and thus not to have stood lawfully as a candidate in the general election.

On the same day the 2003 Niutao by-election was also held, following the death of the Speaker of Parliament, Saloa Tauia in February. There are no political parties in Tuvalu, but Patiale and Tauia were both members of prime minister Saufatu Sopoanga's extremely narrow parliamentary majority. In the 2002 general election, Sopoanga had obtained the support of just 8 MPs (himself included) out of 15. His government thus needed to win both by-elections in order to retain its majority.

Nanumea is a two-seat constituency, and in the 2002 general election it had returned Sio Patiale and Maatia Toafa with 24.8% and 23% of the vote respectively, ahead of five other candidates. For the by-election, of course, only one seat would be provided for, Toafa retaining the other. There were three candidates: Patale, Lagitupu Tuilimu who had held the seat from 1998 2002, and newcomer Lopati Tefoa.

Patiale won comprehensively, obtaining an absolute majority of the vote. This was not immediately enough to save the Sopoanga government, however: Taavau Teii, the winner of the Niutao by-election, was initially uncommitted, then sided with the opposition, providing it with a parliamentary majority. The opposition asked that parliament be recalled, so that a motion of no confidence in the government could be tabled. Sopoanga delayed recalling parliament until September, then appointed opposition MP Faimalaga Luka as governor-general, depriving the opposition of its crucial one-seat majority and triggering the 2003 Nukufetau by-election. The winner of the October by-election, Elisala Pita, joined the government's benches, enabling it to survive a while longer. The Sopoanga government was eventually brought down by an eight-to-six motion of no confidence in August 2004, and Patiale announced his own resignation due to ill-health in April 2005, precipitating yet another by-election in his constituency.

== Result ==
Nanumea by-election, 2003
Party	Candidate	Votes	%	±%
Independent	Sio Patiale	414	58.97%	+34.21%
Independent	Lopati Tefoa	190	27.07%	n/a
Independent	Lagitupu Tuilimu	98	13.96%	+1.88%
Majority		224	31.91%	
Pro-government independent hold		Swing	n/a	

== 2002 result ==
2002 general election: Results for Nanumea
Party	Candidate	Votes	%	±%
Independent	Sio Patiale	332	24.76	
Independent	Maatia Toafa	309	23.04	
Independent	Lagitupu Tuilimu	162	12.08	
Independent	Lopati Lopati	161	12.01	
Independent	Kokea Malua	159	11.86	
Independent	Houati Iele	129	9.62	
Independent	Laina Teuea	89	6.64	
