= 2002 Tuvaluan general election =

- 25 July 2002

All 15 seats in the Parliament of Tuvalu
	First party
Party	Independents
Seats before	15
Prime Minister before election
Koloa Talake
Subsequent
Prime Minister
Saufatu Sopoanga

General elections were held in Tuvalu on 25 July 2002. All candidates were independents, as there were no political parties in the country. Saufatu Sopoanga was appointed prime minister after the election as the previous prime minister Koloa Talake lost his seat.

== Campaign ==
A total of 39 candidates contested the 15 seats. There were 5,188 registered voters.

== Results ==
Six members of the former parliament lost their seats including Prime Minister Koloa Talake and the Speaker, Tomu Sione.

Constituency	Candidate	Votes	%	Notes
Funafuti	Kamuta Latasi	373	38.4	Re-elected
Funafuti	Kausea Natano	364	37.4	Elected
Funafuti	Teleke Lauti	149	15.3	
Funafuti	Elia Tavita	58	6.0	
Funafuti	Loto Pasefika	28	2.9	
Nanumaga	Namoto Kelisiano	354	46.5	Re-elected
Nanumaga	Otinielu Tausi	229	30.1	Re-elected
Nanumaga	Fepuali Kiti	178	23.4	
Nanumea	Sio Patiale	332	24.7	Elected
Nanumea	Maatia Toafa	309	23.0	Elected
Nanumea	Lagitupu Tuilimu	162	12.1	
Nanumea	Lopati T Lopati	161	12.0	
Nanumea	Kokea Malua	159	11.8	Unseated
Nanumea	Houati Iele	129	9.6	
Nanumea	Laina Teuea	89	6.6	
Niutao	Samuelu Teo	317	26.5	Re-elected
Niutao	Saloa Tauia	310	25.9	Elected
Niutao	Tavau Teii	294	24.6	
Niutao	Tomu Sione	276	23.1	Unseated
Nui	Amasone Kilei	319	41.4	Re-elected
Nui	Alesana Seluka	258	33.5	Re-elected
Nui	Rurunteiti Kaiarake	194	25.2	
Nukufetau	Saufatu Sopoanga	281	27.0	Re-elected
Nukufetau	Faimalaga Luka	230	22.1	Re-elected
Nukufetau	Peneueta George	190	18.2	
Nukufetau	Petaia Meauma	150	14.4	
Nukulaelae	Bikenibeu Paeniu	124	57.9	Re-elected
Nukulaelae	Aifou Tafia	61	28.5	
Nukulaelae	Susana Semu	29	13.5	
Vaitupu	Apisai Ielemia	335	23.0	Elected
Vaitupu	Leti Pelesala	185	12.7	Elected
Vaitupu	Matanile Iosefa	175	12.0	
Vaitupu	Lise Talia	172	11.8	
Vaitupu	Teagai Esekia	149	10.2	
Vaitupu	Eti Esela	125	8.6	
Vaitupu	Ioane Malologa	123	8.4	
Vaitupu	Popu Asuelu	105	7.2	
Vaitupu	Koloa Talake	85	5.8	Unseated
Source: Tuvalu Online, Psephos

== Aftermath ==
On 2 August 2002 Saufatu Sopoanga, who had been Minister of Finance in the previous government, was elected prime minister.

=== Subsequent by-elections ===
Several by-elections were held during the 2002–2006 Parliament:

- 2003 Nanumea by-election
- 2003 Niutao by-election
- 2003 Nukufetau by-election
- 2004 Nukufetau by-election
- 2005 Nui by-election
- 2005 Nanumea by-election
- 2005 Nanumaga by-election
