= 2003 Niutao by-election =

- 5 May 2003

One of the two Niutao seats in the Parliament of Tuvalu. Elected by simple majority using first past the post. Triggered by the death of the incumbent.
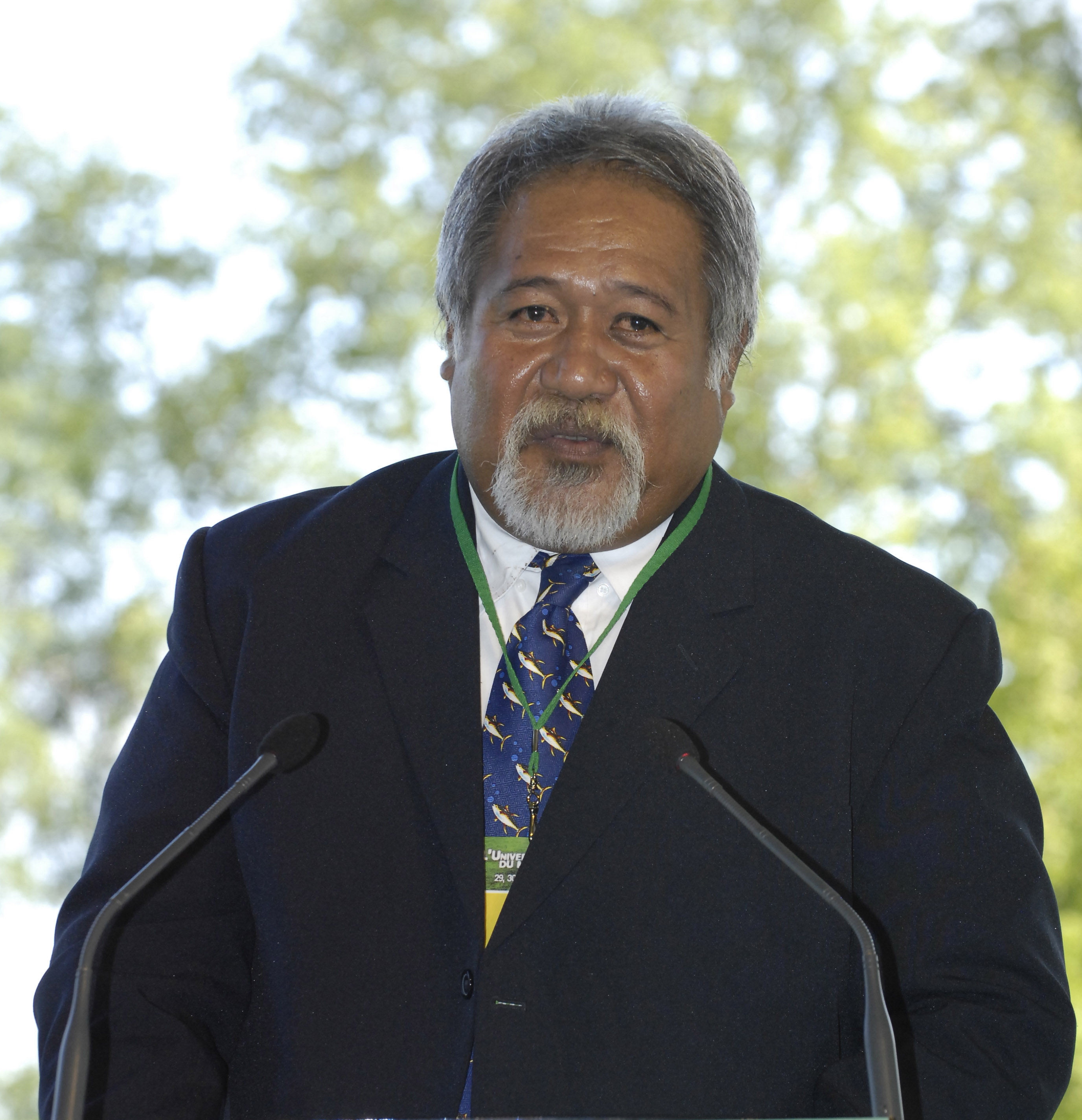
Candidate	Taavau Teii
Party	Independent
Popular vote	unopposed
Percentage	n/a
- Location of Niutao within Tuvalu

A by-election was held in the Niutao constituency in Tuvalu on 5 May 2003. It was triggered by the death of the incumbent MP, Saloa Tauia. Tauia, the Speaker of Parliament, died in February, after having entered Parliament in the July 2002 general election.

On the same day, the 2003 Nanumea by-election was also held, which following the annulment in February of incumbent MP Sio Patiale's election in the July 2002 general election. There are no political parties in Tuvalu, but Patiale and Tauia were both members of prime minister Saufatu Sopoanga's extremely narrow parliamentary majority. In the 2002 general election, Sopoanga had obtained the support of just 8 MPs (himself included) out of 15. His government thus needed to win both by-elections in order to retain its majority.

Niutao is a two-seat constituency, and in the 2002 general election it had returned Samuelu Teo and Saloa Tauia with 26.5% and 25.9% of the vote respectively, ahead of two other candidates. For the by-election, of course, only one seat would be provided for, Teo retaining the other.

There was only one candidate to the by-election: Taavau Teii, who had come third in the constituency in the general election, with 24.56% of the vote. This time, he was thus elected unopposed. He had not indicated during his campaign whether he would side with the government or the opposition, and did not do so immediately after his election. Eventually, he joined the opposition, providing the latter with a one-seat majority in parliament; the Nanumea by-election had returned pro-government MP Sio Patiale to parliament. The opposition asked that parliament be recalled, so that a motion of no confidence in the government could be tabled. Sopoanga delayed recalling parliament until September, then appointed opposition MP Faimalaga Luka as governor general, depriving the opposition of its crucial one-seat majority and triggering the 2003 Nukufetau by-election. The winner of the October by-election, Elisala Pita, joined the government's benches, enabling it to survive a while longer. The Sopoanga government was eventually brought down by an eight-to-six motion of no confidence in August 2004.

Teii would go on to be appointed deputy prime minister under Apisai Ielemia after the 2006 general election, Tuvalu Islands Headline News, November 2007 and would hold that position until he lost his seat in parliament in the 2010 general election.

== Result ==
Niutao by-election, 2003
Party	Candidate	Votes	%	±%
Independent	Taavau Teii	unopposed	n/a	n/a
Independent gain from Speaker		Swing	n/a	

== 2002 result ==
2002 general election: Results for Niutao
Party	Candidate	Votes	%	±%
Independent	Samuelu Teo	317	26.48	
Independent	Saloa Tauia	310	25.90	
Independent	Taavau Teii	294	12.08	
Independent	Tomu Sione	276	23.06	
