= Kitiona Tausi =

Deputy Prime Minister of Tuvalu

The Honourable Kitiona Tausi MP

Deputy Prime Minister & Minister for Fisheries and Trade
- In office July 2022 – 27 February 2024
- Prime Minister: Kausea Natano
- Preceded by: Minute Alapati Taupo
- Succeeded by: Panapasi Nelesoni

Member of Parliament
- In office 5 July 2022 – 26 January 2024
- Preceded by: Minute Alapati Taupo
- Succeeded by: Hamoa Holona
- Constituency: Nanumanga

Personal details
- Born: December 1954 (age 71)
- Party: Independent

Kitiona Tausi (born December 1954) was elected to the Parliament of Tuvalu during 2022 elections to represent the Nanumanga electorate; However he was not re-elected in the 2024 Tuvaluan general election.

He was appointed Deputy Prime Minister & Minister for Fisheries and Trade in the Natano Ministry to succeed Minute Alapati Taupo.

== Career ==
Tausi trained in theology and was appointed as a priest of Tuvalu's main church, Ekalesia Kelisiano Tuvalu, and acted as the general secretary of the organisation. From January 2011 until his retirement he was a parish minister at the Vaialofa Vaiaku Church on Funafuti. Following his retirement, he was appointed as a chaplain to Fetuvalu Secondary School.

Following his retirement, as a parish minister, on 28 September 2020, he established the first private newspaper to operate in the country – Tuvalu Paradise News - and was editor of the print newspaper and website. The Tuvalu Paradise News was published until Tausi was appointed as a member of parliament. In February 2024, Tausi began the publication of a newsletter under the title Island of Hope.

He has been appointed to a number of Tuvaluan government and non-government organisations, including: Tuvalu Association of Non Government Organizations (TANGO), the Tuvalu National Private Sector Organisation (TNPSO), and prior to his election as a member of parliament he was the chairman of the Tuvalu Broadcasting Corporation (TVBC) board of directors.
