= Tuvaluan constitutional crisis =

2012–2013 political dispute in Tuvalu

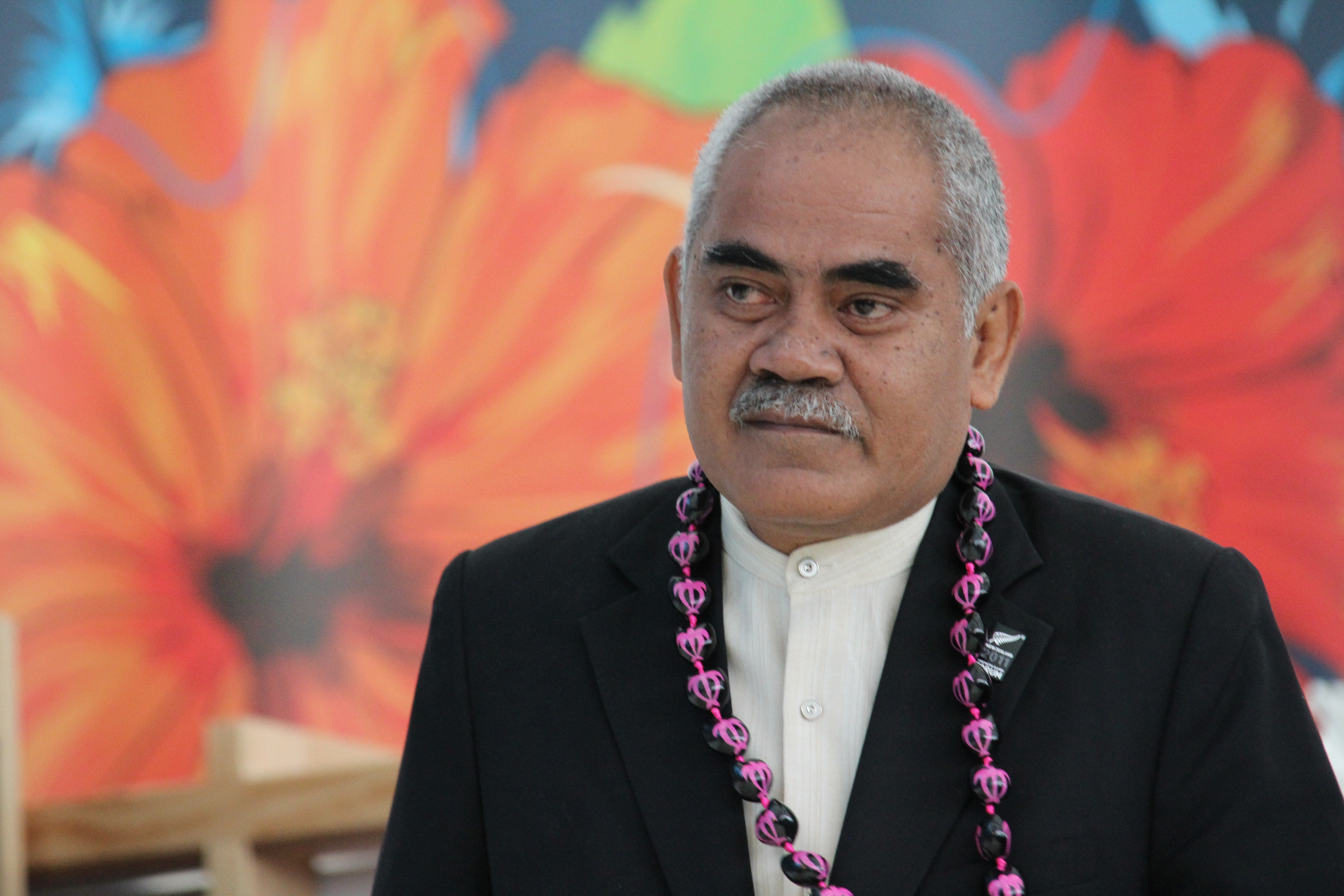
Prime Minister, Willy Telavi, faced a constitutional crisis following the death of his Finance Minister in December 2012

The Tuvaluan constitutional crisis was a political dispute in Tuvalu between the government, led by Prime Minister Willy Telavi, and the opposition, led by Enele Sopoaga, that was precipitated by the death of the Minister of Finance, Lotoala Metia MP on 21 December 2012, which eliminated the government's majority. The dispute was eventually resolved in August 2013 by a motion of no confidence in Prime Minister Willy Telavi, following which Enele Sopoaga was elected Prime Minister.

== Background ==
Tuvalu is a parliamentary democracy. The head of state is the monarch of Tuvalu, who is the same person as the monarch of the United Kingdom and the other Commonwealth realms; at the time of the crisis, the monarch was Queen Elizabeth II. The monarch is represented by the Governor-General, who is appointed (or removed) by the monarch on the advice of the Prime Minister, and to whom almost all of the monarch's duties are delegated. The Prime Minister is elected by the members of the Parliament, but it is within the Governor-General's reserve powers to unilaterally dismiss him.

The dispute began following the sudden death of the incumbent Member of Parliament for Nukufetau, Lotoala Metia, on 21 December 2012, resulting in both the government and opposition having seven representatives in Parliament. Despite protests from the opposition, the ministry of the Prime Minister Willy Telavi delayed a by-election for the seat by more than six months, until June 2013, when the High Court of Tuvalu ordered that the by-election be held within 28 days of the judgment. The decision was delivered by Senior Magistrate Afele Kitiona on behalf of Chief Justice Sir Gordon Ward.

The decision was delivered following two separate legal challenges by both the government and the opposition that sought to determine the minister who was responsible for allowing elections to take place. The ruling gave the opposition the necessary notices required to begin the by-election process in the constituency, which would allow them to gain a majority in parliament and, theoretically, pass a motion of no confidence in the government. Opposition member and lawyer Taukelina Finikaso said the following after the ruling: "We have certainly been working with our candidate and we are quietly confident we will be able to get through this by-election."

== Crisis ==
=== By-election ===
The by-election was eventually held on 28 June 2013 and opposition member Elisala Pita beat the government candidate Petely Niuatui by 537 votes to 264, giving the opposition an 8–7 majority over the government in the Tuvaluan Parliament.

Nukufetau by-election, 2013
Party	Candidate	Votes	%	±%
Independent	Elisala Pita (opposition candidate)	537	67.04	+40.45
Independent	Petely Niuatui (government candidate)	264	32.96	n/a
Majority		273	34.08	
Opposition gain from Government				

The constitutional crisis continued as the Prime Minister announced that, under the Constitution of Tuvalu, he was only required to convene Parliament once a year, and was thus under no obligation to summon it until December 2013.

Tuvalu's opposition then requested the Governor-General Sir Iakoba Italeli to intervene against the Prime Minister's decision. On 3 July, Italeli exercised his reserve powers in ordering Parliament to convene, against the Prime Minister's wishes, on 30 July. Opposition member Finikaso said: "It looks like we have seen the end of the uncertainty that reigned in Tuvalu for the last six months." He continued by announcing that the opposition were planning to move a motion of no confidence in the incumbent prime minister and that they would put forward their candidate for the job.

=== Reconvening of Parliament ===
In an attempt to avoid a vote of no confidence, Prime Minister Willy Telavi tabled a motion to dissolve Parliament, but this was subsequently defeated by the opposition by 8 votes to 5. In a further twist, just minutes later, the government's Health Minister, Taom Tanukale, announced he was resigning his post, helping to dwindle government numbers further from five to four, following Education Minister Falesa Pitoi's absence due to illness. Opposition member Finikaso described how the resignation 'shocked' parliament.

=== Adjournment ===
Following the resignation of the Minister of Health, on 31 July 2013, the Speaker of the Tuvaluan Parliament Sir Kamuta Latasi announced he was adjourning Parliament for six weeks to allow for a by-election to take place in the Nui constituency. The adjournment led to further hostility from the opposition, who hoped to move a vote of no confidence in Telavi, claiming that the Speaker has failed to "listen to the advice of the Attorney-General". In response, Latasi claimed that the constitution does not allow for a vote if a constituency lacks representation, stating:

If he [Telavi] is removed from Parliament he [Telavi] is removed by a two-thirds majority of the total membership. I have already acted on the advice of the Governor-General. The Governor-General has ordered that Parliament sit on the 30th of this month, which we sat yesterday. That order has been carried out by the Speaker of Parliament.

The Attorney-General told the opposition that despite the Health Minister's resignation, the motion of no confidence could still go ahead. The Speaker's response prompted the opposition to seek assistance from the Governor-General for a second time so that parliament could be reconvened once again. The opposition claimed that the prime minister had given no indication that he would call a by-election for Nui, which, in Tuvalu, the PM must do to allow an election to occur.

=== Dismissal of Willy Telavi ===
A day later, on 1 August 2013, Prime Minister Willy Telavi issued a public announcement that he had advised the Queen of Tuvalu, Elizabeth II, to remove Governor-General Itelali from his post. The Queen gave no indication of her reaction to Telavi's letter, leaving Italeli's position secure.

Governor-General Italeli, acting on his reserve powers, sent out a proclamation dismissing Telavi as the Prime Minister of Tuvalu. Minutes later, Opposition leader Enele Sopoaga was appointed as acting prime minister.

Willy Telavi defended his actions in not calling the by-election or recalling Parliament, and placed the responsibility for the constitutional crisis with Sir Iakoba Italeli, the Governor-General, who he says intervened only five days after the by-election, "Though he got the power to do that, we are a small country where we can consult each other without resorting to this kind of exercising of powers".

=== Appointment of Enele Sopoaga ===
On Friday 2 August, Willy Tevali faced a motion of no confidence, the voting was eight for the motion, four against and one abstention – the Speaker abstained from voting on the motion. The Governor-General ordered parliament to meet once again on the following Saturday to elect a new prime minister, and a ballot held was won by the opposition leader by 8 votes to 5; following the vote Enele Sopoaga was sworn in as Tuvalu's new prime minister on 5 August 2013. He appointed his new cabinet to the Sopoaga Ministry the same day. A High Court challenged to Telavi's removal was considered, but never eventuated.

== See also ==
- Politics of Tuvalu
- Elections and political parties in Tuvalu
- Parliament of Tuvalu
- 2013 Nukufetau by-election
