= 2019 Tuvaluan general election =

← 2015	9 September 2019	2024 →

All 16 seats in the Parliament of Tuvalu
	First party
Party	Independents
Seats before	16
- Results by constituency
Prime Minister before election
Enele Sopoaga
Subsequent
Prime Minister
Kausea Natano

General elections were held in Tuvalu on 9 September 2019. There were 37 candidates seeking election to the Parliament, two of whom were women: Valisi Alimau, who was contesting in the Nukufetau electorate, and Puakena Boreham who was seeking re-election in the Nui electorate.

On 19 September 2019 Kausea Natano was elected prime minister by a parliamentary majority of 10 MPs, succeeding Enele Sopoaga, who had held the position for six years and had been seeking re-election to a new term. Samuelu Teo was elected as Speaker of Parliament.

== Electoral system ==
The Electoral Provisions (Parliament) Amendment Act 2019 increased the number of elected representatives for the electorate of Nukulaelae to become 2 PMs. So that each of the 8 island electorates is represented by 2 MPs (Niulakita is represented by the MPs from Niutao). The 16 members of Parliament are elected in eight two-member constituencies using multiple non-transferable vote. As there are no formal political parties, all candidates run as independents.

== Results ==
In the Nukufetau electorate the caretaker prime minister, Enele Sopoaga, was returned to Parliament, however Satini Manuella, Taukelina Finikaso and Maatia Toafa, who were ministers, were not returned. Seven new members of Parliament were elected.

Constituency	Candidate	Votes	%	Notes
Funafuti	Simon Kofe	374	28.6	Re-elected
Funafuti	Kausea Natano	355	27.2	Re-elected
Funafuti	Tuafafa Latasi	349	26.7	
Funafuti	Soloseni Penitusi	158	12.0	
Funafuti	Luke Paeniu	70	5.3	
Nanumanga	Monise Lafai	366	36.2	Re-elected
Nanumanga	Minute Alapati Taupo	361	35.7	Elected
Nanumanga	Otinielu Tausi	284	28.0	Unseated
Nanumea	Ampelosa Manoa Tehulu	603	37.4	Elected
Nanumea	Timi Melei	327	20.3	Elected
Nanumea	Tipelu Kauani	266	16.5	
Nanumea	Maatia Toafa	219	13.6	Unseated
Nanumea	Satini Manuella	198	12.3	Unseated
Niutao	Samuelu Teo	241	18.0	Re-elected
Niutao	Katepu Laoi	235	17.5	Elected
Niutao	Polikapo Piloma Teaukai	231	17.2	
Niutao	Tefiti Telaaka Malau	198	14.8	
Niutao	Iopu Iupasi Kaisala	161	12.0	
Niutao	Itaia Lausaveve	155	11.6	
Niutao	Tavau Teii	119	8.9	
Nui	Puakena Boreham	274	24.9	Re-elected
Nui	Mackenzie Kiritome	249	22.6	Re-elected
Nui	Mataio Tekinene	239	21.7	
Nui	Iakoba Italeli	219	19.9	
Nui	Leneuoti Peau Maatusi	119	10.8	
Nukufetau	Enele Sopoaga	491	35.8	Re-elected
Nukufetau	Fatoga Talama	323	23.5	Elected
Nukufetau	Valisi Alimau	285	20.8	
Nukufetau	Afelee Falema Pita	273	19.9	
Nukulaelae	Seve Paeniu	199	34.5	Elected
Nukulaelae	Namoliki Sualiki	182	31.6	Elected
Nukulaelae	Bikenibeu Paeniu	99	17.1	
Nukulaelae	Luuni Tinilau	96	16.7	
Vaitupu	Nielu Meisake	642	34.0	Elected
Vaitupu	Isaia Taape	494	26.2	Re-elected
Vaitupu	Taukelina Finikaso	425	22.5	Unseated
Vaitupu	Sam Panapa	323	17.1	

== See also ==
- List of by-elections in Tuvalu
- List of Tuvalu MPs, 2019–2024
- Elections and political parties in Tuvalu
- 2019 in Oceania
