= Isaia Taape =

Tuvaluan politician

The Honourable Isaia Vaipuna Taape MP

Minister for Health, Social Welfare and Gender Affairs
- In office 20 September 2019 – 27 February 2024
- Prime Minister: Kausea Natano
- Preceded by: Satini Manuella
- Succeeded by: Tuafafa Latasi

Member of Parliament
- In office 19 July 2017 – 26 January 2024
- Preceded by: Apisai Ielemia
- Constituency: Vaitupu

Personal details
- Party: Independent

Isaia Vaipuna Taape is a Tuvaluan politician. He entered parliament by winning a by-election on 19 July 2017 to represent Vaitupu. The by-election was triggered by incumbent MP Apisai Ielemia's dismissal from the seat by court order. He joined the benches of the parliamentary majority of Prime Minister Enele Sopoaga.

He was reelected in the 2019 Tuvaluan general election. He was appointed the Minister for Health, Social Welfare & Gender Affairs in the Natano Ministry.

He was unseated in the 2024 Tuvaluan general election.
