= Tokelau, Tuvalu =

Village on Nanumanga island

Coordinates: 6.291°S 176.323°E

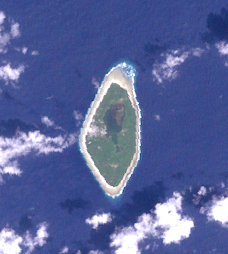

Tokelau, Tuvalu is a village on the island of Nanumanga, Tuvalu.

== Population ==
As of 2012, Tokelau's population was 245. It is the larger of Nanumanga's two villages, the other being Tonga.

== Linguistic background ==
Tokelau means "north-northeast" in Tuvaluan and some other Polynesian languages.

== Climate ==
Tokelau has a tropical rainforest climate (Af) with heavy rainfall year-round.

Climate data for Tokelau
Month	Jan	Feb	Mar	Apr	May	Jun	Jul	Aug	Sep	Oct	Nov	Dec	Year
Mean daily maximum °C (°F)	31.4 (88.5)	31.3 (88.3)	31.3 (88.3)	31.2 (88.2)	31.2 (88.2)	30.9 (87.6)	30.6 (87.1)	30.7 (87.3)	31.1 (88.0)	31.3 (88.3)	31.5 (88.7)	31.4 (88.5)	31.2 (88.1)
Daily mean °C (°F)	28.4 (83.1)	28.3 (82.9)	28.4 (83.1)	28.3 (82.9)	28.4 (83.1)	28.2 (82.8)	28.0 (82.4)	28.0 (82.4)	28.3 (82.9)	28.4 (83.1)	28.4 (83.1)	28.4 (83.1)	28.3 (82.9)
Mean daily minimum °C (°F)	25.4 (77.7)	25.3 (77.5)	25.5 (77.9)	25.5 (77.9)	25.7 (78.3)	25.6 (78.1)	25.5 (77.9)	25.4 (77.7)	25.5 (77.9)	25.5 (77.9)	25.4 (77.7)	25.4 (77.7)	25.5 (77.9)
Average precipitation mm (inches)	330 (13.0)	261 (10.3)	313 (12.3)	236 (9.3)	192 (7.6)	177 (7.0)	196 (7.7)	214 (8.4)	175 (6.9)	193 (7.6)	216 (8.5)	339 (13.3)	2,842 (111.9)
Source: Climate-Data.org

== See also ==
- Tokelauan § Affinities with other languages
