= Caves of Nanumanga =

Underwater cave off the shore of Tuvalu

- Location in Tuvalu
- 6°16′7.32″S 176°19′15″E
- Location: off the northern shore of Nanumanga
- Region: Tuvalu in western Polynesia

The Caves of Nanumanga or Nanumanga Fire Caves are an underwater cave off the northern shore of Nanumanga, Tuvalu, in western Polynesia. It was discovered by two scuba divers in 1986.

== Legend ==
The discovery of the Caves of Nanumanga was made because of interest aroused by a local legend. According to this legend, there existed "a large house under the sea". The existence of this legend led to the scuba diving expedition in 1986, during which the caves were discovered. These are sometimes referred to as the Fire Caves of Nanumanga.

== Sea level debates ==
The caves are currently submerged underneath the ocean, highlighting the profound change in sea level over time. Public controversies regarding sea level changes in contemporary Tuvalu are thus set against this background.

== External links and sources ==
- O'Neill, Graeme (1987-04-13). "Fire cave points to early mariners". The Age.
