= Seve Paeniu =

Tuvaluan politician

The Honourable Seve Paeniu MP
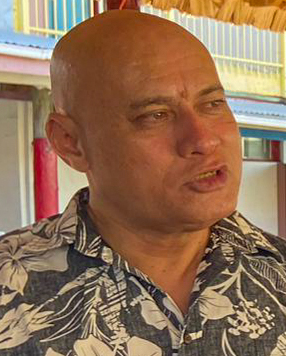
- Paeniu in 2023

Minister of Finance
- In office September 2019 – 27 February 2024
- Prime Minister: Kausea Natano
- Preceded by: Maatia Toafa (Minister for Finance)

Member of Parliament
- Incumbent
- Assumed office September 2019
- Constituency: Nukulaelae

Personal details
- Party: Independent
- Spouse: Malama Lipine Te'o
- Education: Canterbury University; University of Hawaiʻi at Mānoa

Seve Paeniu (born 11 February 1965) is a Tuvaluan politician. Paeniu was elected to the Parliament of Tuvalu in the 2019 Tuvaluan general election to represent the Nukulaelae electorate. He was appointed as the Minister of Finance in the Natano Ministry.

== Education and career ==
Paeniu attended Nelson College, New Zealand (1983–1984). Paeniu graduated from Canterbury University in Christchurch, New Zealand, with a Bachelor of Commerce degree in 1987. He went on to complete a Master of Arts degree in economics in 1995 at the University of Hawaiʻi at Mānoa.

He served as Assistant Planning Officer with Tuvalu's Ministry of Finance from May 1988 to August 1989. In September 1989 he became the Ministry's Director of Planning, serving until December 1993. He was also Economic Consultant with the Asian Development Bank for the Republic of the Marshall Islands May to July 2000. Later that year, he became the director of the Ministry's economic research and policy division. In January 2002, he transferred to the Ministry of Education and Sports, serving as Permanent Secretary until August 2003, when he moved back to the Ministry of Finance, Economic Planning and Industries as Permanent Secretary.(August 2003 – December 2005).

On his appointment as Tuvaluan High Commissioner to Fiji, Paeniu presented his credentials to Fiji's Acting President Ratu Joni Madraiwiwi on 21 February 2006. He was terminated after a new Government in Tuvalu came into office in December.

He was the Sustainable Development Adviser of the Secretariat of the Pacific Regional Environment Programme (SPREP) in Apia, Samoa (March 2007 – June 2010). Secretary for Finance for Nauru (July 2010 – June 2012). Consultant with the UNDP, the UNESCAP and Peer Review Consultant with the Pacific Islands Forum Secretariat (September 2012 – June 2013). Economic and Finance Adviser to the Nauru Minister for Finance (July 2013 – July 2015). Head of Secretariat of the Oceania Customs Organisation (OCO), (August 2015 to September 2019).

== Political career ==
Paeniu was elected to the Parliament of Tuvalu in the 2019 Tuvaluan general election to represent the Nukulaelae electorate. He was appointed as the Minister for Finance in the Natano Ministry.

As the Minister of Finance, he acts as the governor of the National Bank of Tuvalu, and he represents the government of Tuvalu on the board of directors of the Tuvalu Trust Fund. He also represents Tuvalu on the board of governors of the Asian Development Bank. On 18 October 2019, he attended the annual meetings of the International Monetary Fund and the World Bank Group, representing the 9 Pacific Island Countries (PICs) of the Federated States of Micronesia, Kiribati, Marshall Islands, Nauru, Palau, Samoa, Solomon Islands, Vanuatu and Tuvalu. While finance minister he represented Tuvalu at the 2021 United Nations Climate Change Conference in Glasgow.

In July 2020, Seve Paeniu was appointed to the Constitutional Review Parliamentary Select Committee. The Final Report of the Constitutional Review Parliamentary Select Committee was published on 12 December 2022. The work of the committee resulted in the Constitution of Tuvalu Act 2023, which amended the Constitution of Tuvalu.

No candidates contested the sitting MPs Seve Paeniu and Namoliki Sualiki in the 2024 general election, so they were automatically returned to parliament.

== Personal life ==
Paeniu married Malama Lipine Te'o on 7 February 1990. They have five children.

He is a nephew of Bikenibeu Paeniu, who was a former prime minister of Tuvalu.

Political offices
Preceded by Maatia Toafa	Minister of Finance of Tuvalu; 2019–present	Succeeded by Panapasi Nelesoni
