= Tonga, Tuvalu =

Tonga
- Village
- Location in Tuvalu
- Coordinates: 6°17′S 176°19′E
- Country: Tuvalu
- Island: Nanumanga

Area
  - Total: 1.14 km^{2} (0.44 sq mi)

Population (2012)
  - Total: 236
  - Density: 207/km^{2} (540/sq mi)

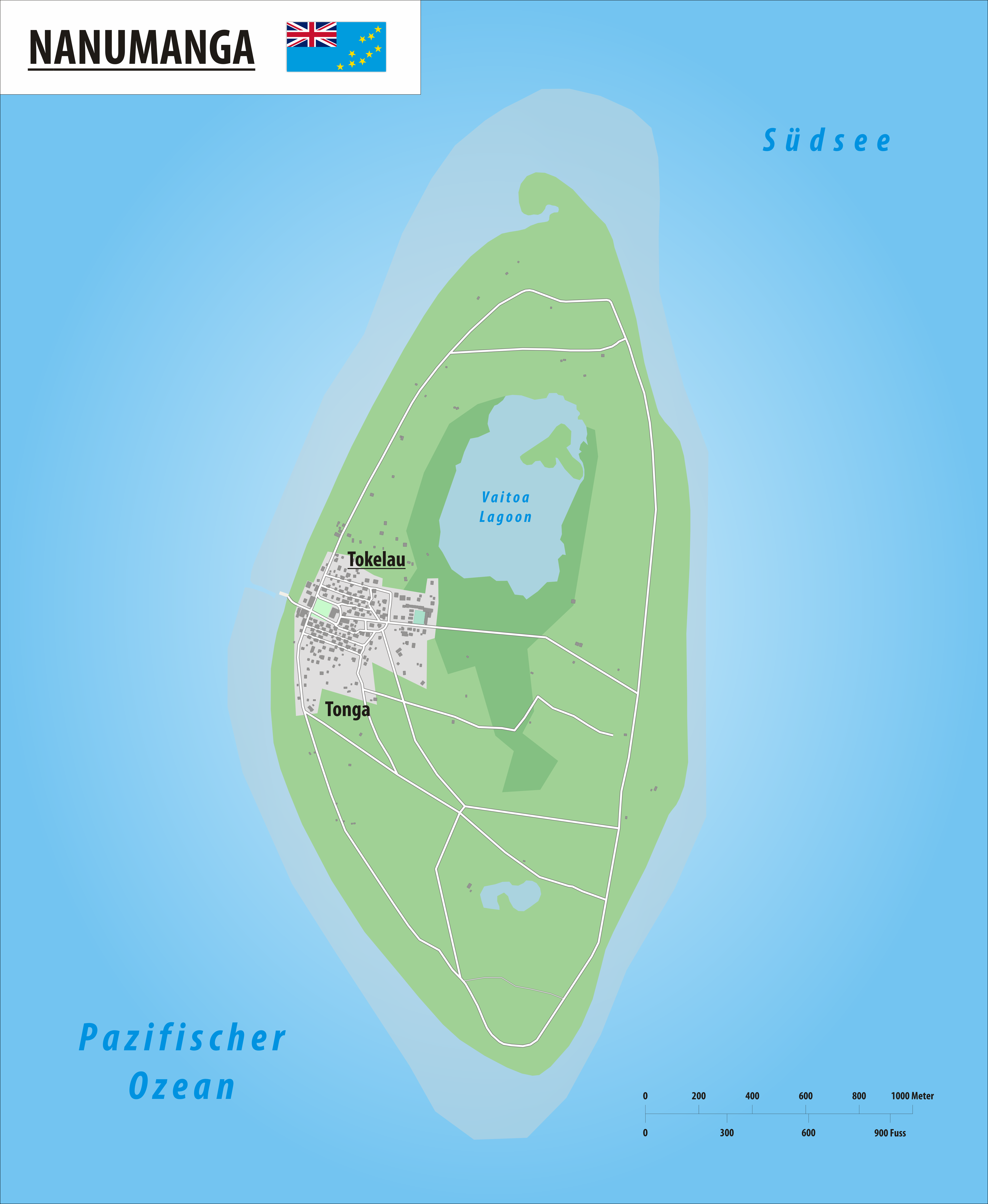
Nanumanga, Tuvalu (Tonga to the West)

Tonga is a village on Nanumanga island in Tuvalu.

== Demographics ==
As of 2012, Tonga's population was 236, making it the second most populous village on Nanumanga. It is the main village of the island of Nanumanga. The only other village on the island is Tokelau, which has a larger population of 243.

== See also ==
- Geography of Tuvalu
