= Nielu Meisake =

Tuvaluan politician

The Honourable Nielu Meisake MP
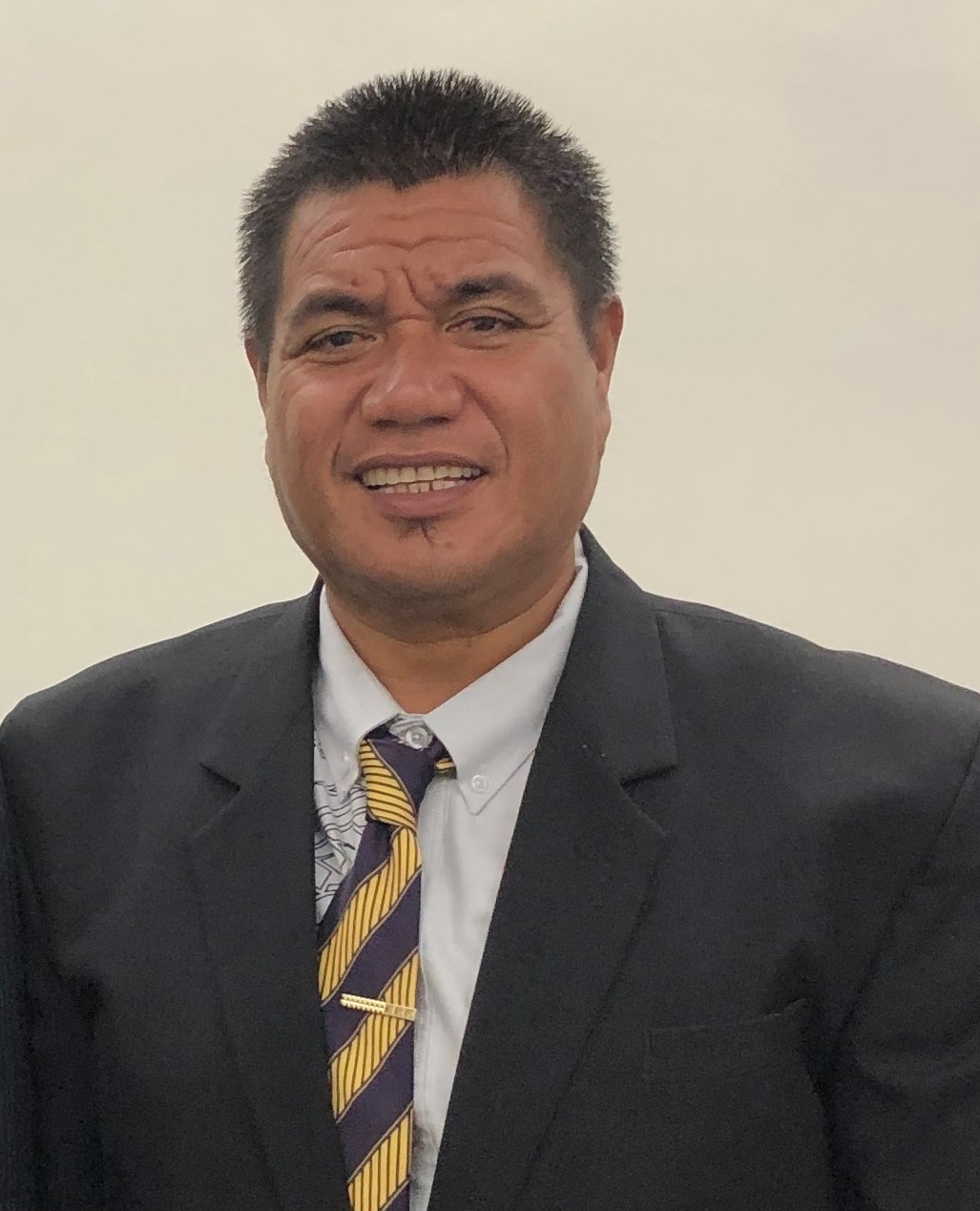
- Meisake in 2019

Minister for Transport, Energy and Tourism
- In office 20 September 2019 – 27 February 2024
- Prime Minister: Kausea Natano
- Preceded by: Monise Laafai (Transport)
- Succeeded by: Simon Kofe (Transport & Energy)

Member of Parliament
- In office 9 September 2019 – 26 January 2024
- Preceded by: Apisai Ielemia
- Constituency: Vaitupu

Personal details
- Party: Independent

Nielu Meisake is a Tuvaluan politician.

He entered parliament in the 2019 Tuvaluan general election. He was appointed the Minister for Transport, Energy and Tourism in the Natano Ministry

He was unseated in the 2024 Tuvaluan general election.
