= Panapasi Nelesoni =

Tuvaluan politician

The Honourable Panapasi Nelesoni MP
- Nelesone in 2023

Deputy Prime Minister & Minister of Finance and Development
- Incumbent
- Assumed office 27 February 2024
- Prime Minister: Feleti Teo
- Preceded by: Seve Paeniu (Minister of Finance)

Minister for Justice, Communications, and Foreign Affairs
- In office August 2023 – 27 February 2024
- Prime Minister: Kausea Natano
- Preceded by: Simon Kofe

Member of Parliament
- Incumbent
- Assumed office 30 June 2023
- Preceded by: Fatoga Talama
- Constituency: Nukufetau

Personal details
- Party: Independent

Panapasi Nelesoni is a Tuvaluan politician. He was previously a civil servant, including being the Secretary to the Government. He was elected to parliament to represent Nukufetau in a by-election held on 30 June 2023.

In August 2023, Nelesoni was appointed as the Minister for Justice, Communications, and Foreign Affairs. to succeed Simon Kofe, who resigned as the minister to focus on parliamentary work to amend the Constitution.

During Nelesoni's term as foreign minister, prime minister Kausea Natano signed the Australia–Tuvalu Falepili Union, a bilateral treaty which covered migration, climate change, security arrangements and their bilateral diplomatic relationship.

Nelesoni was re-elected in the 2024 general election. He was appointed Deputy Prime Minister & Minister of Finance and Development in the Teo Ministry.

Political offices
| Preceded by Seve Paeniu | Minister of Finance; 2024–present | Incumbent |
Political offices
| Preceded by Simon Kofe | Foreign Minister of Tuvalu; 2023–2024 | Succeeded by Paulson Panapa |
