= Vete Sakaio =

Tuvaluan politician

The Honourable Vete Sakaio OBE
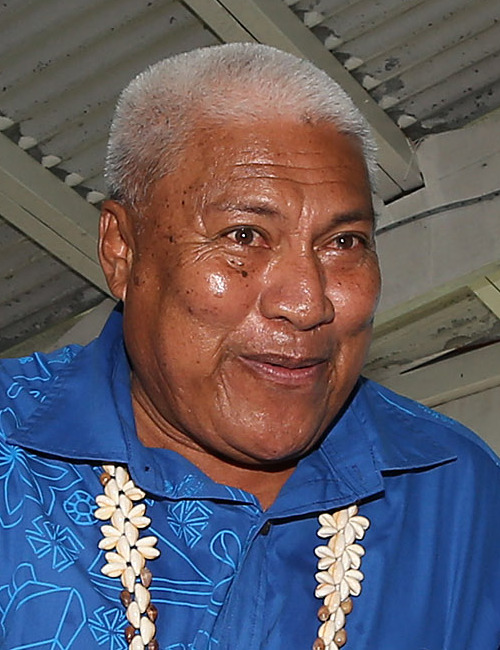
- Sakaio in 2014

Deputy Prime Minister of Tuvalu
- In office 5 August 2013 – 10 April 2015
- Prime Minister: Enele Sopoaga
- Preceded by: Kausea Natano
- Succeeded by: Maatia Toafa

Minister of Public Utilities
- In office 5 August 2013 – 10 April 2015
- Prime Minister: Enele Sopoaga
- Preceded by: Kausea Natano
- Succeeded by: Enele Sopoaga

Minister of Works and Natural Resources
- In office 29 September 2010 – 24 December 2010
- Prime Minister: Maatia Toafa
- Preceded by: Tavau Teii
- Succeeded by: Isaia Italeli

Member of Parliament
- In office 16 September 2010 – 31 March 2015; Served with Fauoa Maani
- Preceded by: Tavau Teii; Tomu Sione
- Succeeded by: Fauoa Maani; Samuelu Teo
- Constituency: Niutao

Personal details
- Party: Independent

Vete Sakaio is a Tuvaluan politician.

A civil engineer by trade, he was described in 2008 as a "leader of the community" on his home island of Niutao. He is also the Vice President of the Tuvalu Association of Sports and National Olympic Committee, and a leading member of the Tuvalu Amateur Sports Association.

In 2010, he went into politics, standing for Parliament in the general election. He was elected MP for Niutao. Following the election, he was appointed as Minister for Works and Natural Resources in Prime Minister Maatia Toafa's Cabinet. He lost office just three months later, when Toafa's government was brought down by a motion of no confidence.

Vete Sakaio was appointed Deputy Prime Minister and Minister for Public Utilities on 5 August 2013 following Enele Sopoaga becoming prime minister.

On 28 September 2013, Vete Sakaio concluded his speech to the General Debate of the 68th Session of the United Nations General Assembly with an appeal to the world, "please save Tuvalu against climate change. Save Tuvalu in order to save yourself, the world".

In the 2015 New Year Honours, Sakaio was appointed an Officer of the Order of the British Empire (OBE) for public and community service.

Vete Sakaio was not re-elected in the 2015 Tuvaluan general election.
