= Simon Kofe =

Tuvaluan politician

The Honourable Simon Kofe MP
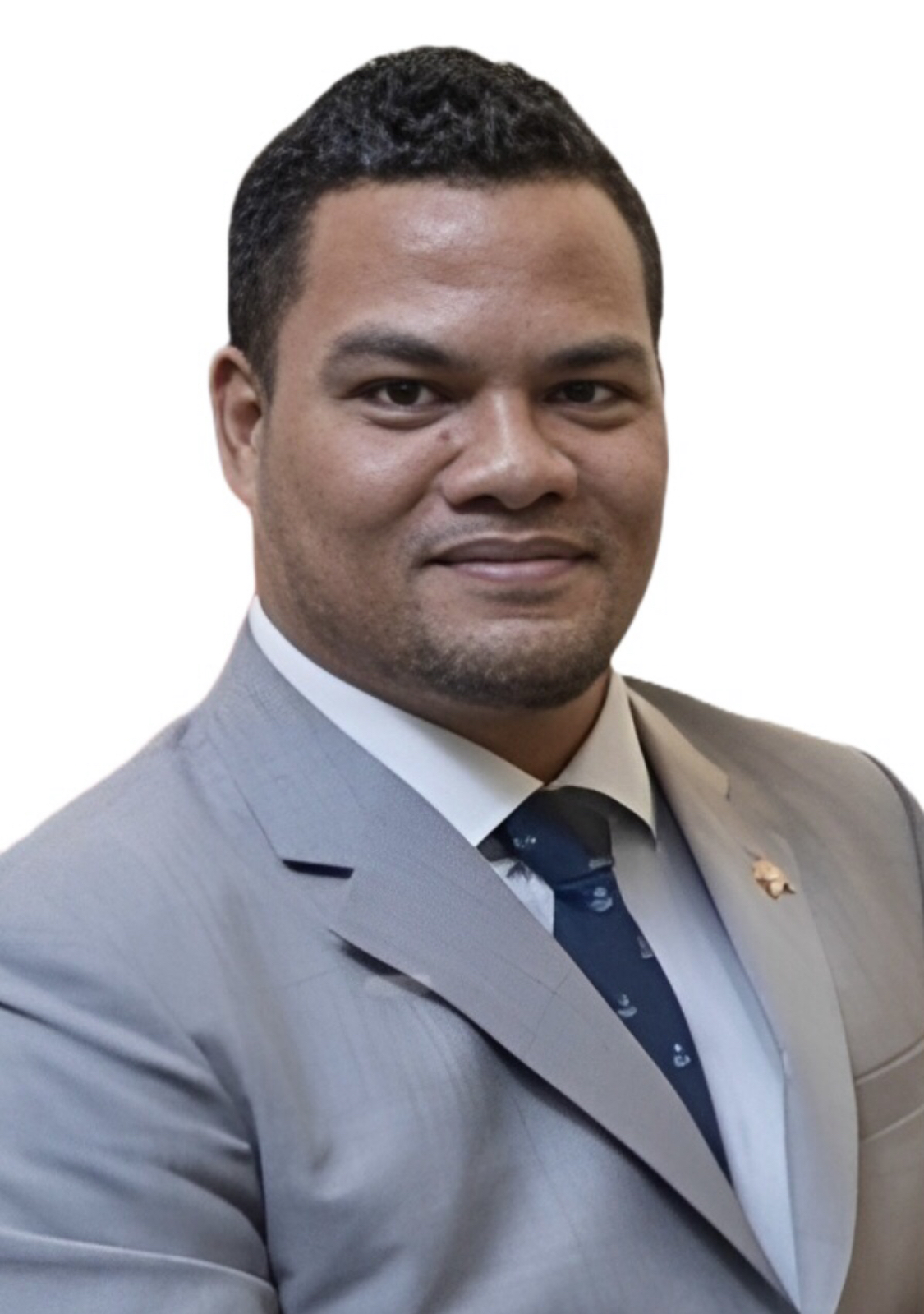
- Kofe in 2019

Minister for Transport, Energy, Communication, and Innovation
- Incumbent
- Assumed office 27 February 2024
- Prime Minister: Feleti Teo
- Preceded by: Nielu Meisake (Transport & Energy); Panapasi Nelesoni (Communications)

Minister for Justice, Communication & Foreign Affairs
- In office 19 September 2019 – July 2023
- Prime Minister: Kausea Natano
- Preceded by: Taukelina Finikaso (Foreign Affairs); Monise Laafai (Communications)
- Succeeded by: Panapasi Nelesoni

Member of Parliament
- Incumbent
- Assumed office 20 November 2018; Serving with Kausea Natano
- Preceded by: Sir Kamuta Latasi
- Constituency: Funafuti

Personal details
- Party: Independent
- Education: University of the South Pacific (USP); University of Malta

Simon Kofe is a Tuvaluan politician. He was appointed as the Minister for Justice, Communication & Foreign Affairs, in the cabinet of Kausea Natano following the 2019 Tuvaluan general election.

== Early life ==
He is the son of a Tuvaluan teacher at the University of the South Pacific (USP) in Suva, Fiji, Kofe was educated in a primary school of the Marist Brothers in Suva. He attended secondary school in various schools while his parents worked in several countries of Oceania.

== Legal career ==
Kofe earned a Bachelor of Laws degree from the University of the South Pacific in 2004, followed by a master's degree in international maritime law from the University of Malta in 2014. As the former senior magistrate of Tuvalu, Afele Kitiona, retired in mid-June 2014, Kofe was appointed as senior magistrate on 24 September 2014.

In May 2016, as the senior magistrate, Kofe determined that former Prime Minister Apisai Ielemia was guilty of corruption and sentenced him to 12-month imprisonment. In June 2016, Justice Norman Franzi of the High Court of Tuvalu quashed Ielemia's conviction and acquitted him of the abuse of office charges. The appeal to the High Court held that the conviction was "manifestly unsafe", with the court quashing the 12-month jail term. On 13 March 2017, the Court of Appeal upheld an appeal by the Crown on the sole ground that the personal interactions outside Court between Justice Franzi and counsel for Ielemia meant that the judgment of acquittal had to be set aside. The effect of the judgment was that Ielemia's conviction and sentence by the Senior Magistrate was re-instated but remained subject to a rehearing of the appeal by the High Court. On 26 May 2017, following the rehearing of Ielemia's appeal against conviction and the Crown's appeal against sentence, Justice Finnane dismissed Ielemia's appeal and upheld the Crown appeal against sentence and, on 29 May 2017, imposed a new sentence of one year and 11 months. On 18 September 2017, the Court of Appeal dismissed Ielemia's appeal on conviction and allowed the appeal on sentence thereby reinstating the Senior Magistrate's sentence of 12 months imprisonment.

== Parliamentary career ==
Sir Kamuta Latasi resigned as MP on 17 October 2018. A by-election was held on 20 November 2018, with Kofe winning his seat with a 30.5% of the total votes in his favour. In an interview he stated that he would like to contribute to the constitutional reform project, with which project he had participated in his role as senior magistrate.

He served in the parliamentary Opposition in the government of Prime Minister Enele Sopoaga during the last months of the 2015-2019 legislature. At the time of his election to parliament, he was the youngest of the members of parliament at age 35. He was re-elected in the 2019 Tuvaluan general election.

On 19 September 2019, Kausea Natano was voted into the office of Prime Minister of Tuvalu by a parliamentary majority consisting of 10 MPs. Kofe was appointed as the Minister for Justice, Communication & Foreign Affairs.

Kofe was re-elected in the 2024 Tuvaluan general election. Kofe was appointed the Minister for Transport, Energy, Communication, and Innovation in the Teo Ministry.

== Climate activism and role as the Minister for Foreign Affairs (2019-2023) ==
On 27 October 2021, Kofe launched Tuvalu’s ‘Future Now Project’ (Te Ataeao Nei Project in Tuvaluan). The project’s first initiative is values- or culture-based approach to diplomacy based on Tuvaluan values of olaga fakafenua (communal living systems), kaitasi (shared responsibility), and fale-pili (being a good neighbour), in the hope other nations will be motivated to understand their shared responsibility to mitigate climate change and sea level rise. A values- or culture-based approach to diplomacy was reflected in Tuvalu’s 2020 Foreign Policy statement (Te Sikulagi).

In November 2021, Kofe recorded a speech for the COP26. In the video, he stood knee-deep in seawater to highlight Tuvalu being on the frontline of climate change. The following year, in November 2022, he recorded a speech where he outlined that in response to rising sea levels, Tuvalu will replicate itself into the Metaverse, stating that "our land, our ocean, our culture are the most precious assets of our people and to keep them safe from harm, no matter what happens in the physical world, we will move them to the cloud."

== Role in constitutional reform (2020-2023) ==
In July 2020 the Parliament of Tuvalu adopted a Motion to establish: “a constitution committee that would monitor in ensuring that the constitution plans for the review are observed”. Simon Kofe was appointed the chair of the Constitutional Review Parliamentary Select Committee. The Final Report of the Constitutional Review Parliamentary Select Committee was published on 12 December 2022. on the same date The Constitution of Tuvalu Bill 2022 was published.

Kofe resigned from the Cabinet in July 2023 to focus on amending the Constitution.

On 5 September 2023, Tuvalu’s parliament passed the Constitution of Tuvalu Act 2023, with the changes to the Constitution came into effect on 1 October 2023.

The 2023 amendments to the Constitution adopt an innovative approach to determining the boundaries of the State of Tuvalu. Section 2(1) states the perpetual statehood of Tuvalu “notwithstanding the impacts of climate change or other causes resulting in loss to the physical territory of Tuvalu”. Tuvalu, and other Pacific Ocean countries support such a position on the impact on territorial boundaries caused by climate change. The leaders of the Pacific Islands Forum countries published a declaration on 6 August 2021 that recalling that Pacific Islands Forum Members have a long history of support for the United Nations Convention on the Law of the Sea (the “Convention”), and which declaration ended with a proclamation: “that our maritime zones, as established and notified to the Secretary-General of the United Nations in accordance with the Convention, and the rights and entitlements that flow from them, shall continue to apply, without reduction, notwithstanding any physical changes connected to climate change-related sea-level rise.”

Kofe summarised the changes to the Constitution as focussing on key areas: "(1) the climate crisis and recognition of Tuvalu’s statehood; (2) enhancing the stability of governance; (3) judicial reforms; and (4) rights and culture."

Political offices
Preceded by Taukelina Finikaso	Foreign Minister; 2019–2023	Succeeded by Panapasi Nelesoni
