= Saloa Tauia =

Tuvaluan politician

Saloa Tauia MP

Speaker of the Parliament of Tuvalu
- In office August 2002 – February 2003
- Prime Minister: Saufatu Sopoanga
- Preceded by: Tomu Sione

Member of the Tuvaluan Parliament for Niutao
- In office 25 July 2002 – February 2003

Personal details
- Died: February 2003
- Party: Independent

Saloa Tauia (? - February 2003) was a Tuvaluan politician who served as Speaker of Parliament from August 2002 until his death in February 2003.

Saloa Tauia had earlier served as the Chief of Police & Chief Immigration Officer. 1990 marked Tauia’s 33 year as a police officer. Tauia was appointed as an Ordinary Member of the Civil Division of the Most Excellent Order of the British Empire (MBE) in 1990 for public service. He also serviced as Crown Counsel and as a Magistrate.

He was elected to Parliament in the July 2002 general election to represent Niutao. He was appointed as the speaker. He died in February 2003.
