= National Bank of Tuvalu =

Coordinates: 8°31′27.7″S 179°11′43.3″E

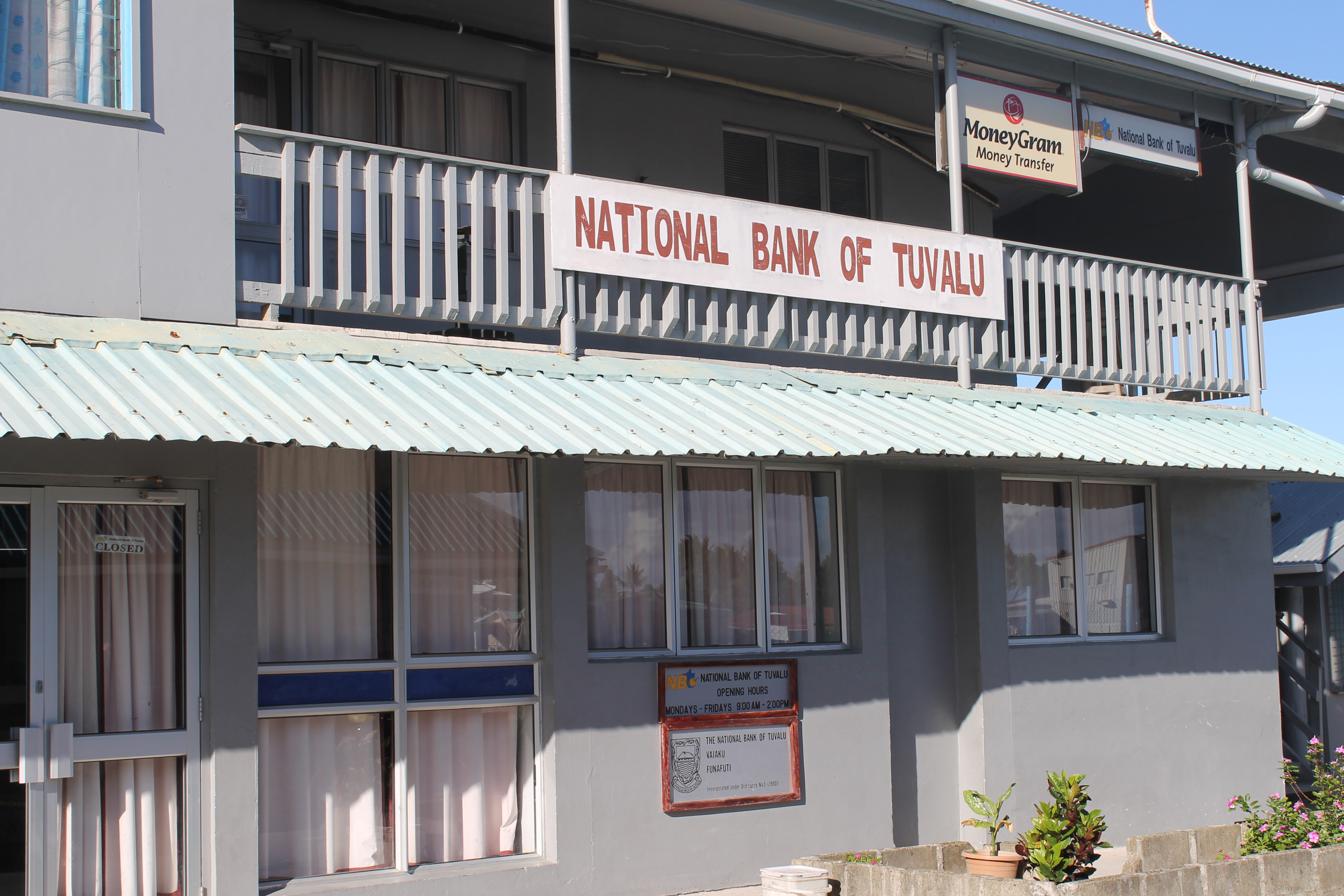

Agency overview
- Jurisdiction: Tuvalu
- Headquarters: Funafuti
- Employees: 45
- Agency executive: Siose P Teo, General Manager
- Parent agency: Ministry of Finance and Economic Planning

The National Bank of Tuvalu (NBT) is the sole provider of banking services in Tuvalu. These services include taking deposits, making loans, and engaging in foreign exchange transactions. In 2020, its assets were AUD$128 million, or 160% of the country's GDP.

There is no monetary authority or central bank in Tuvalu. The NBT performs some monetary functions for the government, including holding government accounts and foreign assets.

The NBT is the only institution in Tuvalu that offers foreign exchange transactions. It buys and sells foreign exchange at rates determined by its board, which considers the rates quoted in the international markets.

The NBT cashes traveller's cheques. As of 2025, it operates five ATMs, the only ATMs in Tuvalu. The Tuvaluan dollar is not an independent currency but a variation of the Australian dollar. Tuvalu began issuing its own coins in 1976, which circulate alongside Australian coins, and it continues to use Australian banknotes.

== Establishment ==
The NBT was established as a corporate body under the National Bank of Tuvalu in 1980 as a subsidiary of Barclays Bank. In 1985, it became a joint venture between the government of Tuvalu, which held 60% of the shares, and Westpac, which held the remaining 40%. In 1995, the government acquired Westpac's shares. The headquarters of the NBT are at Vaiaku in Funafuti, and agencies are operated on all eight outer islands.

== Constitution ==
The National Bank of Tuvalu 1980 states that "the Bank shall act in accordance with any policy directions in the national interest given to it from time to time in writing by the Minister [of Finance]". NBT has a board of directors consisting of the secretary for finance and four others (excluding members of Parliament) appointed by the minister for periods determined by the minister. The board is required "to ensure that Bank policy is directed towards the national interest and has due regard to the stability and balanced development of the economy of Tuvalu."

The board appoints a general manager for a term of up to 5 years. The general manager must attend board meetings but has no voting rights.

== Operations ==
In 2001, the NBT employed two managers (finance and administration, and lending and operations) and 38 officers, clerks, and tellers. In 2009, the staff level of the NBT was 45 employees.

The NBT's deposit rates are low by regional standards, and lending rates are the same or above those charged in more competitive banking systems.

Between 1990 and 2000, the NBT operated profitably, returning an average of 58.3% on net assets before tax and contributing an annual average of $507,000 in company tax and dividends to the government. Earnings on foreign exchange transactions are a major source of income. In 2001, loans and advances were around 28% of total deposits, reflecting the limited opportunities for domestic lending and conservative reserves management. The level of operations in the first quarter of 2001 resulted in A$1.2 million in new lending: 58% of personal loans were for family commitments, including funeral, wedding, and birthday expenses; 29% for travelling; and 11% for education; the remaining 2% are advances to seamen.

As of 2008, the NBT has maintained its profitability. A review by the Asian Development Bank, related to an ADB facility for the government of Tuvalu, recommended that the NBT implementation prudent fiscal discipline to improve liquidity. The changes include the repayment by the government of Tuvalu of an overdraft of around A$5 million, in respect of which the bank has a foregone interest of approximately A$500,000 per year. Tuvalu joined the International Monetary Fund (IMF) on 24 June 2010. The IMF 2014 Country Report noted the NBT had restricted its exposure to public enterprises and made substantial provisions regarding debtors. Effective 7 October 2016, Tuvalu accepted the Article VIII obligations of the IMF Articles of Agreement to maintain an exchange system free of restrictions on payments for international transactions.

In April 2020, the NBT lost its corresponding banking relationship (CBR) with Australian banks, which inhibits the flow of remittances and foreign exchange transactions. Although the NBT continues to have a CBR with the Bank of Hawaii and has developed a CBR with the BRED Bank Fiji.

In April 2025, the NBT opened the first five ATMs in Tuvalu in what Prime Minister Feleti Teo called a "significant milestone" for the country's financial system.

== Other financial institutions in Tuvalu ==
Loans are available from the Tuvalu National Provident Fund (TNPF), which is owned by its members and has the legal form of a mutual fund rather than a body corporate owned by shareholders. The TNPF invests social contributions from slightly more than half the country's population, with payments from the TNPF made on retirement.

The Development Bank of Tuvalu (DBT), which began in 1993, is also owned by the government of Tuvalu. The DBT provides development loans. The IMF 2014 Country Report also noted the DBT had made substantial provisions regarding debtors.
