= Monise Laafai =

Tuvaluan politician and businessman

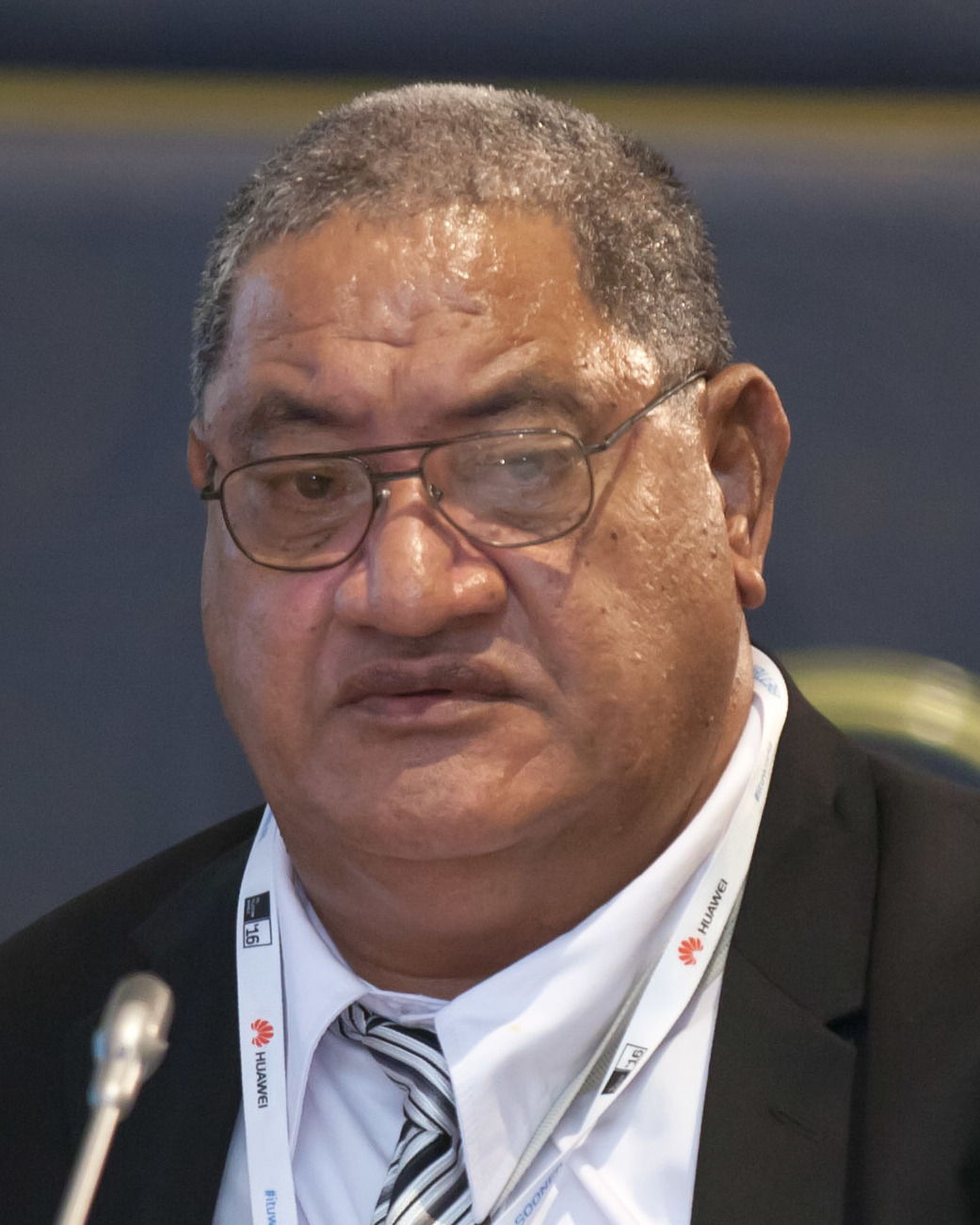
- Monise Laafai at the ITU Telecom World 2016

Minister for Communications and Transport
- In office 5 August 2013 – 19 September 2019
- Prime Minister: Enele Sopoaga
- Preceded by: Kausea Natano
- Succeeded by: Simon Kofe

Minister of Finance
- In office 29 September 2010 – 24 December 2010
- Prime Minister: Maatia Toafa
- Preceded by: Lotoala Metia
- Succeeded by: Lotoala Metia

Member of the Tuvaluan Parliament for Nanumaga
- Incumbent
- Assumed office 16 September 2010
- Preceded by: Otinielu Tausi

Personal details
- Party: Independent

Monise Laafai is a Tuvaluan politician and businessman.

He stood for Parliament for the first time at the 2010 general election, and was elected MP for the constituency of Nanumaga. He supported Maatia Toafa's successful bid for the premiership, and was subsequently appointed to Cabinet, as Minister of Finance. He lost office just three months later, when Toafa's government was brought down by a motion of no confidence.

Laafai is also General Manager of the Tuvalu Co-operative Society, a position he has held since the late 1990s. He was also chef de mission of the Tuvaluan delegation to the 2007 Pacific Games in Samoa.

On 5 August 2013 Monise Laafai was appointed Minister for Communications and Transport; and served as the minister during the Sopoaga Ministry.

He was re-elected in the 2019 general election; and again in the 2024 Tuvaluan general election.

Political offices
Preceded by Lotoala Metia	Minister of Finance; 2010	Succeeded by Lotoala Metia
