= 2003 Nukufetau by-election =

A by-election was held in the Nukufetau constituency in Tuvalu as the consequence of the appointment of the opposition member of parliament Faimalaga Luka as the Governor-General of Tuvalu.

== Context ==
During his term as Prime Minister of Tuvalu, Saufatu Sopoanga experienced a shifting alliance of MPs who supported him, and there was also an opposition group against him. Both Sapoanga's group and the opposition group were plagued by defections; a series of by-elections also created uncertainty as to which side would emerge with a parliamentary majority.

The Sopoanga government lost its majority in May 2003, following the results of the 2003 Nanumea by-election and the 2003 Niutao by-election. Amasone Kilei, the leader of the opposition, wrote to Sir Tomasi Puapua, the governor-general, on 10 May 2003 advising that he commanded the support of a majority of the members of parliament and they were ready to form a government. The leader of the opposition also commenced legal proceedings in the High Court of Tuvalu.

Eventually Saufatu Sopoanga recalled parliament to meet in September 2003. On 9 September Sopoanga arranged to appointed opposition MP Faimalaga Luka as governor general to follow Sir Tomasi Puapua. This appointment deprived the opposition of its crucial one-seat majority and triggering the Nukufetau by-election.

== Result ==
The winner of the October by-election, Elisala Pita, joined the government's benches, enabling it to survive into 2004. The survival of the Sopoanga government has been described as resulting from his dexterous handling of the distribution of ministerial and other appointments.
