= Tavau Teii =

Tuvaluan politician

The Right Honourable Tavau Teii OBE
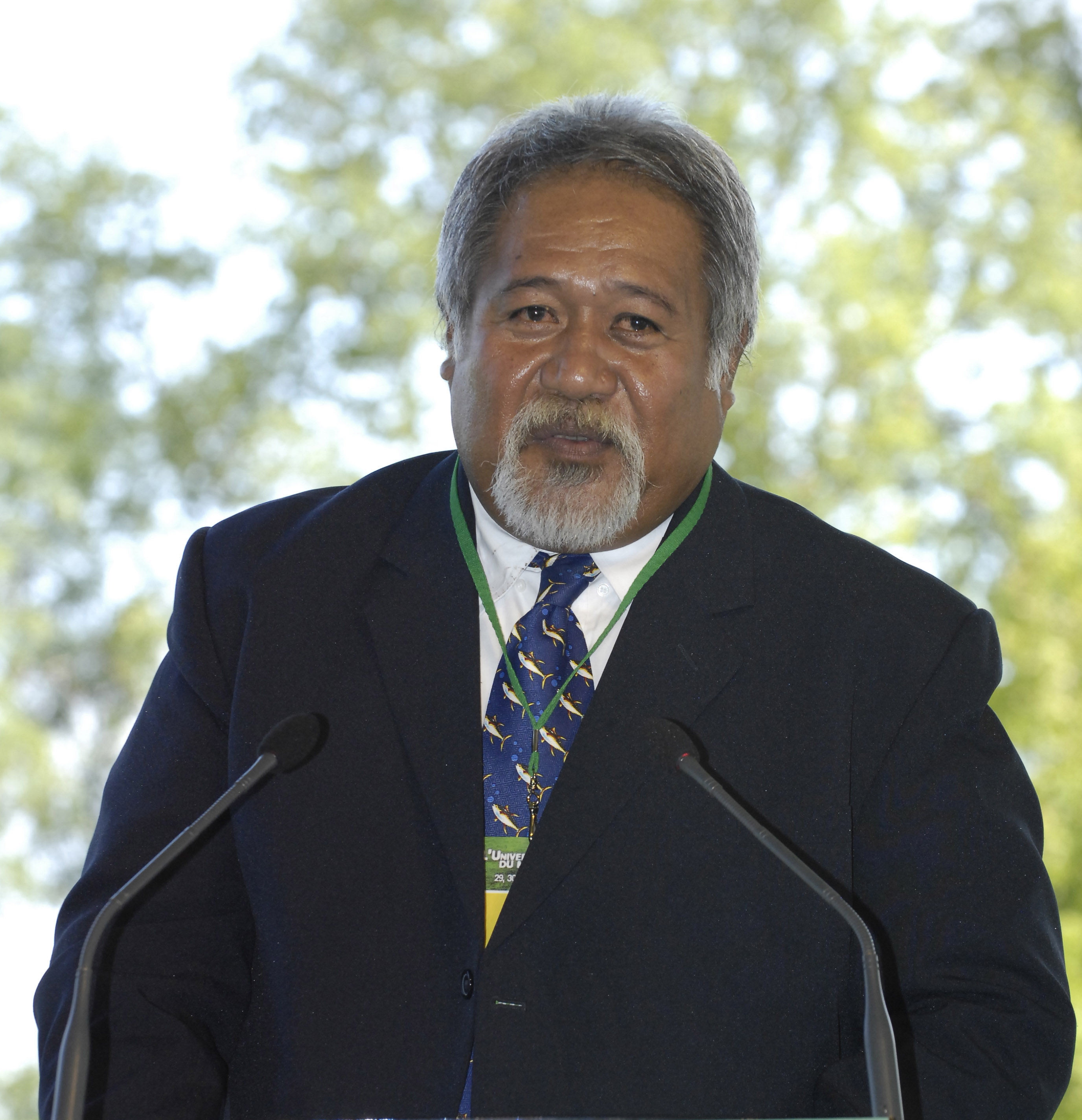
- Teii in 2007

Deputy Prime Minister of Tuvalu
- In office 14 August 2006 – 16 September 2010
- Monarch: Elizabeth II
- Governors General: Filoimea Telito; Sir Kamuta Latasi; Sir Iakoba Italeli
- Preceded by: Kokeiya Malua
- Succeeded by: Enele Sopoaga

Personal details
- Born: Tuvalu
- Occupation: Politician

Tavau Teii is a political figure from the Pacific nation of Tuvalu.

== Election ==
After standing unsuccessfully for Parliament in the 2002 general election in the constituency of Niutao, Teii won a by-election on 5 May 2003 triggered by the death of the incumbent.

== Deputy Prime Minister of Tuvalu ==
He was Deputy Prime Minister of Tuvalu in the Ielemia Ministry (2006–2010). His ministerial portfolio included that of Minister of Natural Resources.

Teii lost his bid for re-election in the 2010 Tuvaluan general election. He was a candidate in the 2015 Tuvaluan general election and received 90 votes, but was not elected to parliament. He was a candidate in the 2019 general election, but was not elected to parliament.

== United Nations appearances ==
During his tenure as Minister of Natural Resources and Environment, Teii attended the Nairobi Climate Change Summit held in November 2006. As Deputy Prime Minister Teii represented Tuvalu to discuss the implications of climate change at the United Nations High-Level Event on Climate Change at the United Nations General Assembly, between 29 September 2007 and 1 October 2007. Teii proposed possible changes to the Kyoto Protocol to be discussed at the Bali Climate Change Conference held between 3 and 15 December 2007.

In his speech on 29 September 2007, Teii declared that "Tuvalu is highly vulnerable to the impacts of climate change so we are seeking new funding arrangements to protect us from the impacts of climate change," and "Rather than relying on aid money we believe that the major greenhouse polluters should pay for the impacts they are causing."

== Honours ==
Teii was appointed Officer of the Order of the British Empire (OBE) in the 2010 Birthday Honours for services to politics.

== See also ==
- Politics of Tuvalu
