= Taukelina Finikaso =

Tuvaluan politician

Hon. Taukelina Taui Finikaso MP
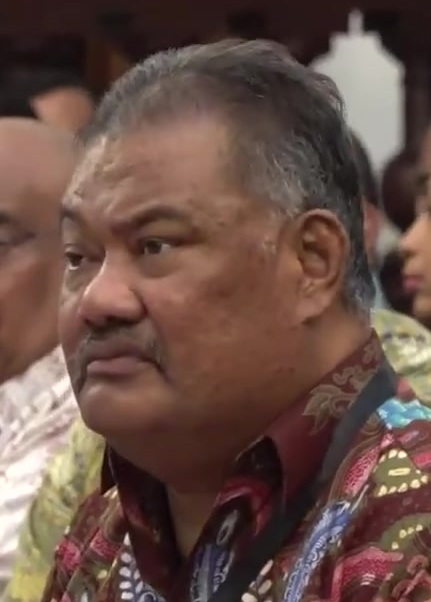
- Finikaso in 2019

Minister for Foreign Affairs, Trade, Tourism, Environment and Labour
- In office 5 August 2013 – 9 September 2019
- Prime Minister: Enele Sopoaga
- Preceded by: Apisai Ielemia
- Succeeded by: Simon Kofe

Member of the Tuvaluan Parliament for Vaitupu
- In office 3 August 2006 – 9 September 2019
- Preceded by: Leti Pelesala
- Succeeded by: Nielu Meisake

Personal details
- Born: 10 January 1959 (age 67) Vaitupu, Gilbert and Ellice Islands
- Party: Independent
- Spouse: Risasi Finikaso
- Children: Tusi, Lise, Petesa, Samasoni

Taukelina Finikaso (born 10 January 1959) is a political figure from the Pacific nation of Tuvalu. At the 2006 general election, he was elected MP for his home constituency of Vaitupu. He was educated in Kiribati and Fiji before acquiring a Law Degree at the University of Tasmania and a master's degree in International Law from Sydney University. Finikaso was admitted on 16 October 1987 to the Supreme Court of the Australian Capital Territory. Prior to entering into politics, Finikaso worked as a lawyer and then as a Permanent Secretary under the different ministries of the Government. Finikaso has been a Member of Parliament for the Constituency of Vaitupu from 2006 to 2019. He was not re-elected in the 2019 general election.

== Career ==
1987–1992: Crown-Counsel in the Attorney General's Office; 1992–1994: Permanent Secretary for the Ministry of Natural Resources; 1994–1996: Permanent Secretary for the Ministry of Home Affairs & Labour; 1996–1997: Permanent Secretary for the Ministry of Health and Human Resources Development; 1997: Established the office for the Trade Commissioner in Asia, based in Hong-Kong; 1997–1998: Permanent Secretary for the Ministry of Health, Women and Community Affairs; 1998–1999: Permanent Secretary for the Ministry of Works, Energy and Communications; 2000–2005: Tuvalu's High Commissioner to Fiji.

=== Ministerial offices ===
Newly elected Prime Minister Apisai Ielemia initially appointed him Minister of Communications and Works, then as Minister for Communications, Transport and Tourism.

At the September 2010 general election, Finikaso was re-elected as MP for Vaitupu. Maatia Toafa was elected to the premiership, and appointed Finikaso as part of his Cabinet, with the portfolio of Minister for Communications, Transport and Fisheries. He lost office just three months later, when Toafa's government was brought down by a motion of no confidence.

Taukelina Finikaso was appointed the Foreign Minister on 5 August 2013; and served as the minister during the Sopoaga Ministry.

Political offices
Preceded by Apisai Ielemia	Foreign Minister of Tuvalu; 2013–2019	Succeeded by Simon Kofe

== See also ==
- List of foreign ministers in 2017
- Foreign relations of Tuvalu
- Politics of Tuvalu
