= Elisala Pita =

Tuvaluan politician

The Right Honourable Elisala Pita OBE

Minister for Works and Natural Resources
- In office 5 August 2013 – 22 August 2016
- Prime Minister: Enele Sopoaga
- Preceded by: Willy Telavi

Leader of the Opposition
- In office 11 October 2004 – 14 August 2006
- Prime Minister: Maatia Toafa
- Preceded by: Apisai Ielemia
- Succeeded by: Maatia Toafa

Member of the Tuvaluan Parliament for Nukufetau
- In office 28 June 2013 – 22 August 2016
- Preceded by: Lotoala Metia
- In office 10 October 2003 – 16 September 2010
- Preceded by: Faimalaga Luka
- Succeeded by: Enele Sopoaga

Personal details
- Died: 22 August 2016 Funafuti
- Party: Independent

Elisala Pita (died 22 August 2016) was a Tuvaluan politician.

Pita "had a long and distinguished career with the Fisheries Department" in Tuvalu, "culminating in his being employed as a Fisheries Adviser with the USAID". For the latter position, he was based in Suva, Fiji. He eventually returned to his home country, and worked in public service, becoming Permanent Secretary for Natural Resources and the Environment. In the 2001 Birthday Honours, he was appointed an Officer of the Order of the British Empire (OBE) "for public and community service".

He first entered parliament as an MP for Nukufetau in a by-election in October 2003. At the time, Prime Minister Saufatu Sopoanga was struggling to retain a majority in parliament. There are no political parties in Tuvalu, and Pita was elected without having said which side of parliament he would join. He considered the matter for several days after his election, then joined the government's side, helping it maintain a majority.

In August 2004, however, he crossed the floor, providing the Opposition with the majority it needed to topple the government through a motion of no confidence. Over the following weeks, Opposition leader Maatia Toafa and ousted prime minister Saufatu Sopoanga formed an unexpected alliance. Pita seized the opportunity to challenge for the premiership. A vote in parliament on 11 October made Toafa prime minister with eight votes, Sopoanga serving as his deputy. Pita received seven votes, and became the leader of the Opposition. He held the position until the 2006 general election, after which he sat as a backbencher. From 2008 to 2010, as MP, he was Chairman of the Public Accounts Committee.

He lost his seat in parliament in the 2010 general election, with Enele Sopoanga (brother of the former Prime Minister) replacing him. He subsequently served as Chief Executive of the Tuvalu National Private Sector Organisation, lobbying for "stronger ties between the private sector and the government". He was selected as the Opposition's candidate for a crucial by-election in Nukufetau on 28 June 2013, which would determine which side of parliament had a majority. Pita pledged, if elected, to enable the Opposition leader Enele Sopoanga, the man who whose election ousted Pita from parliament, to bid for the premiership. He won the seat with more than two thirds of the vote, and the Opposition immediately asked for parliament to be reconvened.

After the subsequent vote of no confidence in the government of Willy Telavi, Elisala Pita was appointed Minister for Works and Natural Resources on 5 August 2013 following Enele Sopoaga becoming prime minister. Following the 2015 Tuvaluan general election Elisala Pita was re-appointed as the Minister for Works and Natural Resources. Pita died on 22 August 2016 in Funafuti.
