= Nanumanga =

Reef island and one of nine districts of Tuvalu

- Reef Island
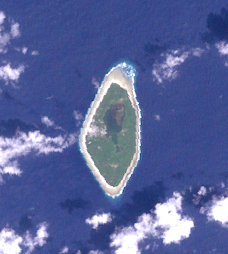
- NASA Landsat visible color image

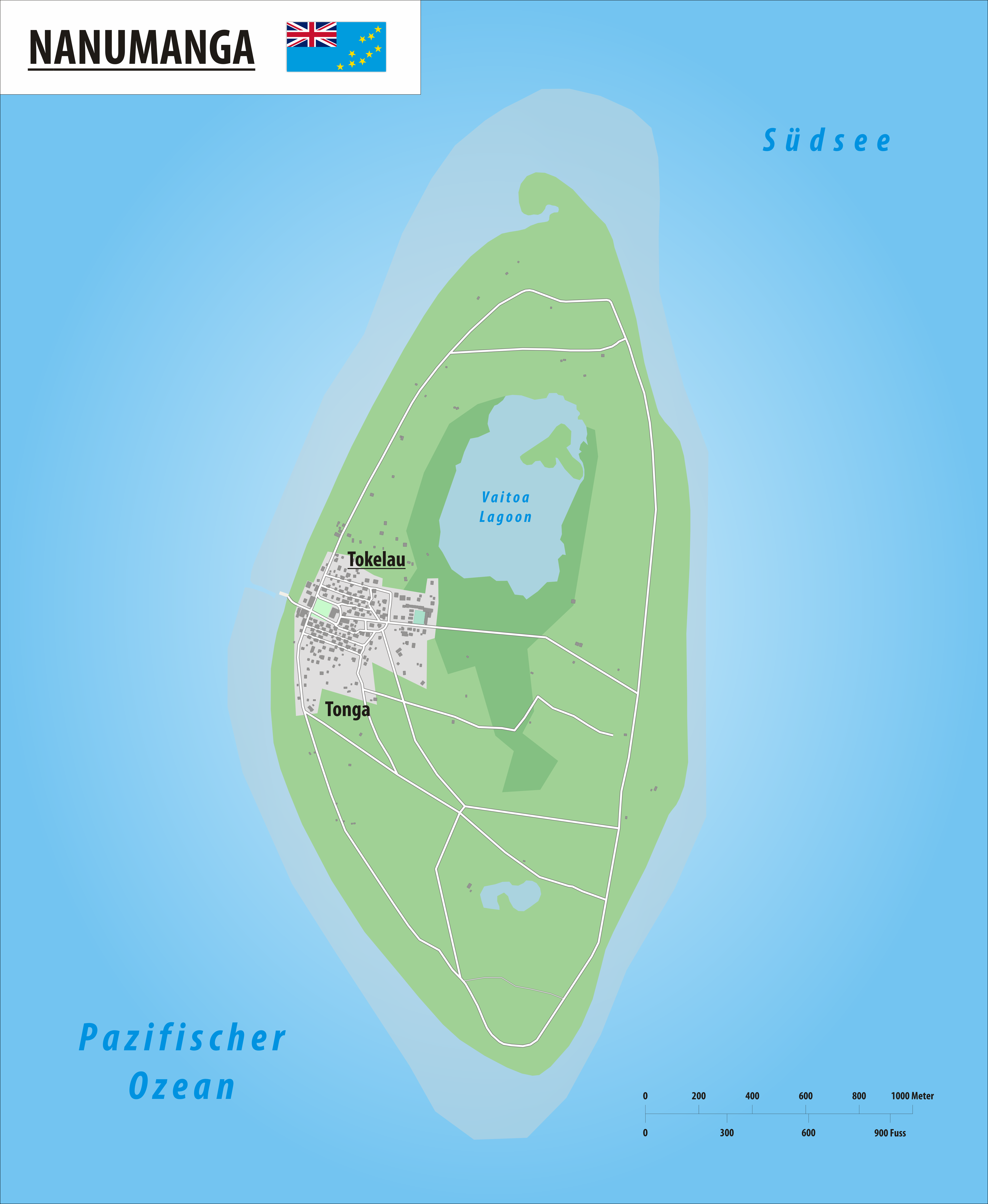
- Map of the island

- Location in Tuvalu
- Coordinates: 06°17′15″S 176°19′15″E
- Country: Tuvalu

Area
  - Total: 2.78 km^{2} (1.07 sq mi)

Population (2022)
  - Total: 391
  - Density: 141/km^{2} (364/sq mi)
- Demonym: Nanumangan
- ISO 3166 code: TV-NMG

Nanumanga or Nanumaga is a reef island and a district of the Oceanian island nation of Tuvalu. It has a surface area of about 3 km^{2} with a population of 391 (2022 census).

== History ==
On 9 May 1824 a French government expedition under Captain Louis Isidore Duperrey of the ship La Coquille sighted Nanumaga.

The US Exploring Expedition visited in 1841.

Louis Becke, who later became a writer, became the resident trader for the Liverpool firm of John S. de Wolf and Co. on Nanumaga from about April 1880 until the trading-station was destroyed later that year in a cyclone. Becke later wrote The Rangers of the Tia Kau, that describes a shark attack at the Tia Kau reef between Nanumea and Nanumaga.

The population of Nanumaga from 1860 to 1900 is estimated to be between 300 and 335 people.

Nanumaga Post Office opened around 1925.

In 1986 it became a centre of debate when Pacific archaeologists discovered the submerged Caves of Nanumanga, and found what they argued was the remains of fire created by pre-historic inhabitants.

== Geography ==
The Nanumaga landscape consists of the main village settlements of Tonga and Tokelau, the two main pits for swamp taro (Cyrtosperma merkusii), (known in Tuvalu as Pulaka), the mangrove forest surrounding the internal lagoons and the areas of general vegetation which includes coconuts, pandanus trees and other vegetation types.

The island has an oval outline, with the longer axis oriented north–south. A fringing reef surrounds the whole island, which makes local fishing and transport into and out of the island difficult.

There are two brackish-water lagoons, the largest, Vaiatoa, having four islands. Vaiatoa Lagoon is located in the north of the island while the smaller Ha’apai Lagoon is in the south. A causeway has been construct to the south of Vaiatoa Lagoon linking the village areas of Tonga and Matematefaga.

There are mangrove trees, native broadleaf forest and coconut palms. The two recorded mangrove species in Tuvalu are the common Togo (Rhizophora stylosa) and the red-flowered mangrove Sagale (Lumnitzera littorea). The mangrove forest of the northern Vaiatoa lagoon covers an area approximately 20 hectares.

Nanumaga has a Locally Managed Marine Area, which encompasses the entire island. No fishing is allowed on the reef on the western side of the island, except handlining. Spear fishing is also totally banned on the island. A sea mount located just off the northern tip of the island is an important key fishing ground, which has been declared a ‘no anchor zone’.

In March 2015 Nanumaga suffered damage to houses, crops and infrastructure as the result of storm surges caused by Cyclone Pam; 60-100 houses were flooded and the health facility suffered damage.

=== Capes ===
- Cape on the north: Te Kaupapa
- Cape on the south: Te Papa

=== Villages ===
At the 2012 census the population of the villages was:

- Tokelau with 245 people;
- Tonga, also spelled Toga with 236 people.

The junior school is Lotohoni Primary School.

== Transportation ==
There are a few paths and unpaved roads. There are no airports, so everything goes in and out by boat. There is an unprotected 10m wide boat channel that cuts into the fringing reef. The boat landing is where passengers and cargo is landed from the inter-island ferry workboats.

== Politics ==
Nanumanga is one of the eight constituencies in Tuvalu, and elects two Members of Parliament. Following the 2024 general election, Monise Lafai was returned to parliament and Hamoa Holona was elected to parliament.

Nanumanga constituency results
Party	Candidate	Votes	%
Nonpartisan	Monise Lafai	292	29.95
Nonpartisan	Hamoa Holona	265	27.18
Nonpartisan	Malofou Sopoaga	251	25.74
Nonpartisan	Otinielu Tausi	167	17.13

== Climate crisis ==
In 2016 the Tuvalu National Council for Women worked with the Green Climate Fund to enable women from the islands of Nanumea and Nanumaga to be part of talks about climate crisis. One of their key issues was the additional burden of social care that women take on in the aftermath of natural disasters.

The activities of the Tuvalu Coastal Adaptation Project on Nanumanga are designed to reduce exposure to coastal erosion by providing a buffer during storms.

== Notable residents ==
Otinielu Tausi was the deputy prime minister in the government of Kamuta Latasi (December 1993 to December 1996); Deputy Prime Minister and Minister for Natural Resources and also the Home Affairs and Rural Development in the 2nd government of Bikenibeu Paeniu (1996 to 1998). He served as the speaker of the Parliament of Tuvalu from 2003 until 2006, then again from March 2014 until 9 September 2019.

The Reverend Dr Kitiona Tausi trained in theology and was appointed as a priest of Tuvalu's main church, Ekalesia Kelisiano Tuvalu, and acted as the General Secretary of the organisation. Tausi served as the chairman of the Tuvalu Broadcasting Corporation Board of Directors. He was elected to represent Nanumaga in the by-election held on 15 July 2022. He was appointed Deputy Prime Minister & Minister for Fisheries and Trade in the Natano Ministry, until the 2024 general election.

Tuau Lapua Lapua is a Tuvaluan Olympic weightlifter. At the 2013 Pacific Mini Games, Tuau Lapua Lapua won Tuvalu's first ever gold medal in major sporting competition in the men's 62 kilogram snatch. He also won bronze in the clean and jerk, and obtained the silver medal overall for the combined event.
