= Kausea Natano =

Prime Minister of Tuvalu from 2019 to 2024

The Right Honourable Kausea Natano MP
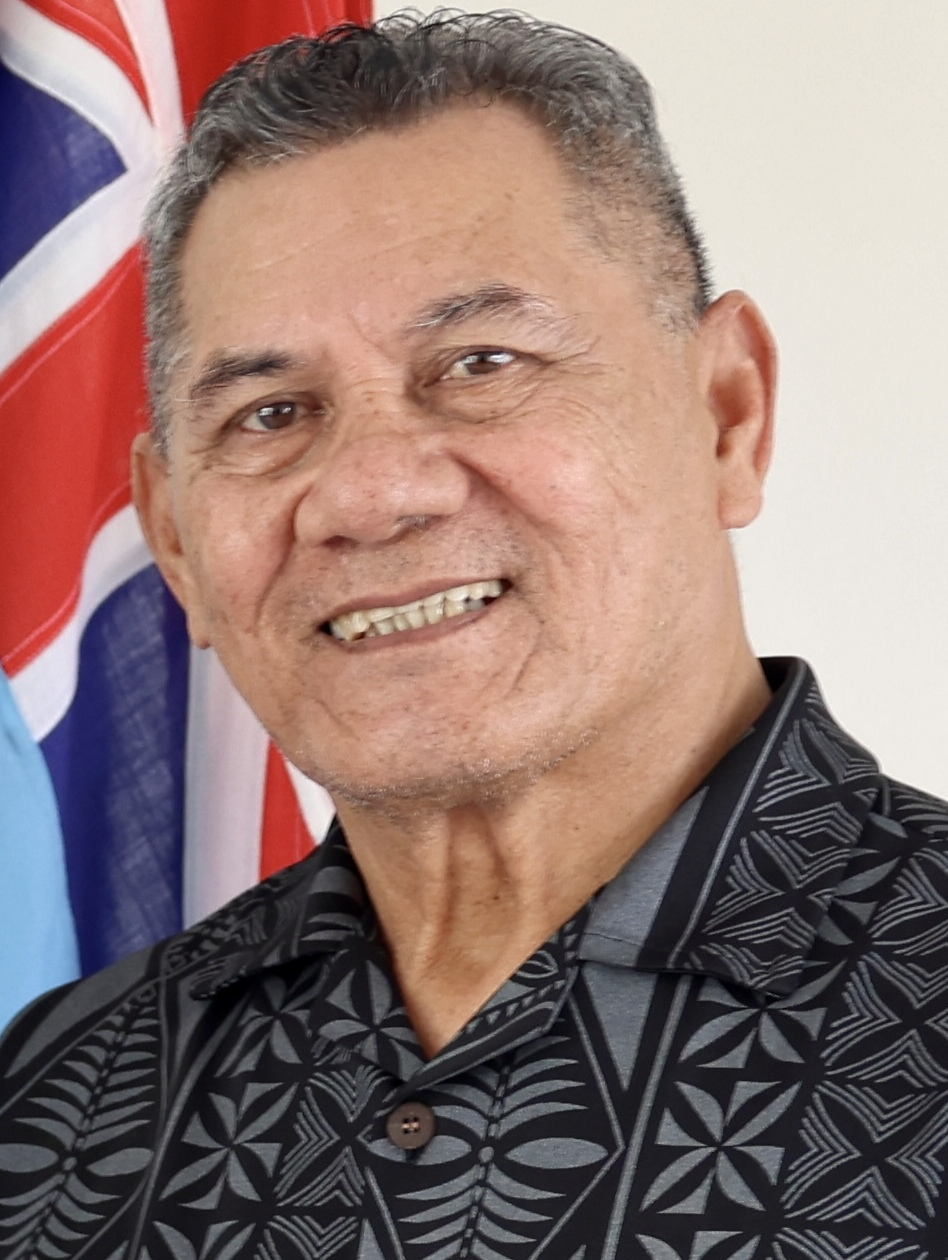
- Natano in 2023

13th Prime Minister of Tuvalu
- In office 19 September 2019 – 26 February 2024
- Monarchs: Elizabeth II; Charles III
- Governor General: See list: Teniku Talesi Honolulu (acting) Samuelu Teo (acting) Sir Tofiga Vaevalu Falani
- Deputy: Minute Alapati Taupo (2019-2022); Kitiona Tausi (2022-2024)
- Preceded by: Enele Sopoaga
- Succeeded by: Feleti Teo

Deputy Prime Minister of Tuvalu
- In office 24 December 2010 – 2 August 2013
- Prime Minister: Willy Telavi
- Preceded by: Enele Sopoaga
- Succeeded by: Vete Sakaio

Minister of Public Utilities
- In office 24 December 2010 – 2 August 2013
- Prime Minister: Willy Telavi
- Preceded by: Taukelina Finikaso
- Succeeded by: Vete Sakaio

Member of Parliament for Funafuti
- In office 25 July 2002 – 26 January 2024
- Preceded by: Ionatana Ionatana; Teleke Lauti

Personal details
- Born: 5 July 1957 (age 68) Funafuti
- Spouse: Selepa Kausea Natano

Kausea Natano (born 5 July 1957) is a Tuvaluan politician who served as the Prime Minister of Tuvalu from 19 September 2019 to 26 February 2024. He represented Funafuti as a Member of Parliament. He was first elected in the 2002 Tuvaluan general election and served as an MP until he was unseated in the 2024 Tuvaluan general election.

In his political career, Natano has also assumed significant roles, including Deputy Prime Minister and Minister for Communications, during his tenure in the Cabinet led by former Prime Minister Willy Telavi.

== Early life ==
Before he entered politics, Natano worked as the director of customs in Tuvalu. He also held the position of assistant secretary in the ministry of finance, where he contributed to economic planning.

== Political career ==
Kausea Natano entered Tuvalu's Parliament in 2002, marking the start of his political career. He secured re-election in 2006 He also took on the role of Minister for Public Utilities and Industries until 2010 as part of Prime Minister Apisai Ielemia's Cabinet. His continuous commitment to public service was evident as he retained his parliamentary seat in the 2010, 2015, and 2019 general elections.

In the 2024 Tuvaluan general election Natano did not retain his seat in parliament.

=== Deputy Prime Minister (2010–2013) ===
Following the 2010 general election, Natano stood for the premiership, and received seven votes from MPs, thus being narrowly defeated by Maatia Toafa, who received eight. In December 2010, Toafa's government was ousted in a motion of no confidence, and Willy Telavi succeeded to the premiership. Natano was among those who supported Telavi, enabling his accession. Upon appointing his Cabinet on December 24, Telavi appointed Natano as Minister for Communications. He was also appointed Deputy Prime Minister.

Following the removal of Prime Minister Willy Telavi by Governor General Sir Iakoba Italeli on 1 August 2013, prompted by a political crisis where Telavi sought to govern without Parliament's support, the subsequent day saw a parliamentary vote. In this vote, Natano and the entire Cabinet were ousted from office, as the opposition had gained a clear majority.

=== Prime Minister (2019 - 2024) ===
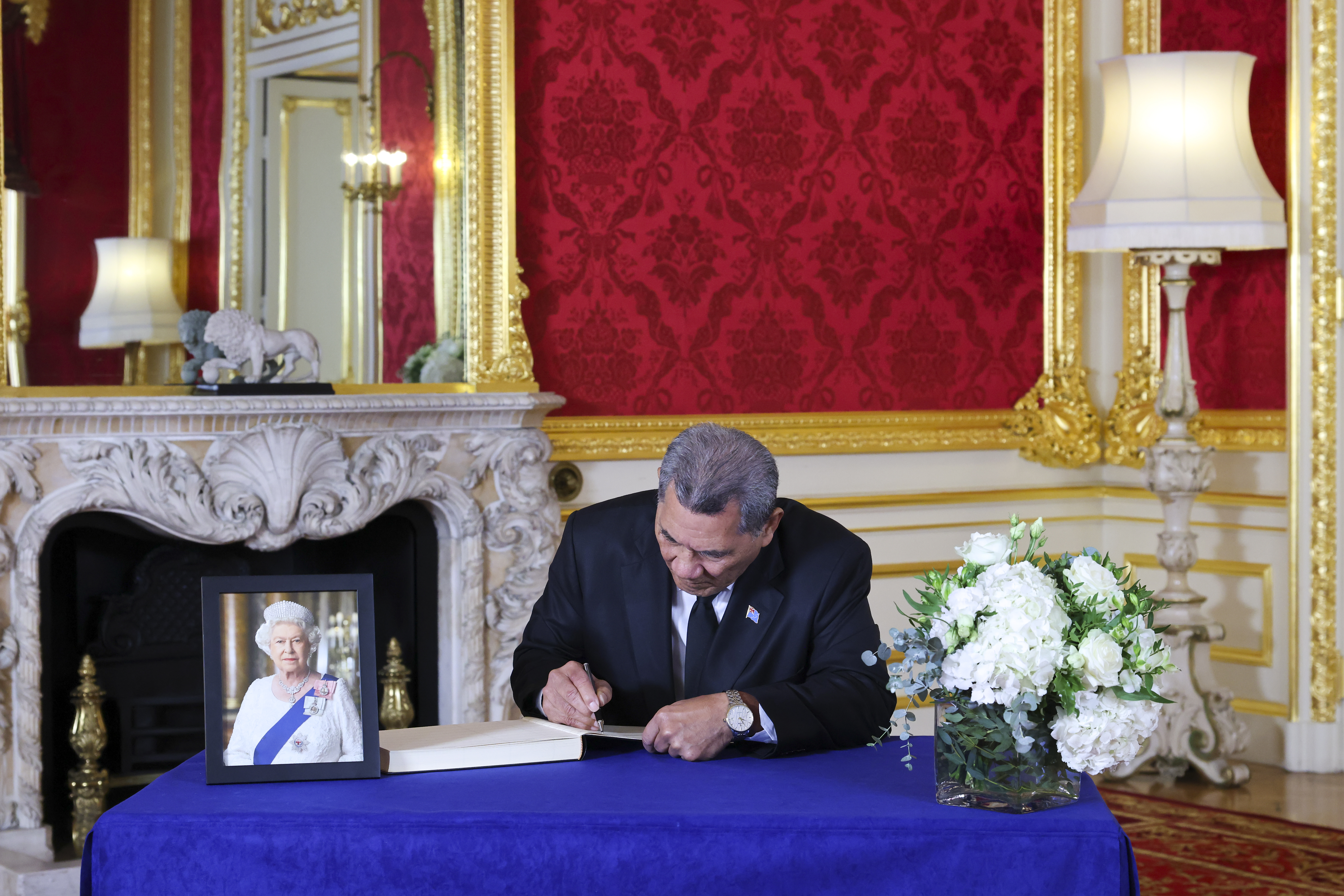
Natano signing the book of condolence for Queen Elizabeth II at Lancaster House on 17 September 2022

Following the 2019 Tuvaluan general election, on 19 September 2019, the members of parliament elected Natano as prime minister with a 10–6 majority.

During his ministry, the economy of Tuvalu experienced challenges resulting from the COVID-19 pandemic. Tuvalu limited travel to Funafuti International Airport in early 2020. The government of Tuvalu put in place The COVID-19 (Threatened Emergency) Regulation 2021, then published the Standard Operating Procedure for International Travel to Tuvalu. Tuvalu remained free of COVID-19 infections and implemented a vaccine program. By April 2022, 85% of 12-17-year-olds had received their first dose of vaccine, and about 90% of its adult population were fully vaccinated. In 2023, the IMF Article IV consultation with Tuvalu concluded that a successful vaccination strategy allowed Tuvalu to lift coronavirus disease (COVID-19) containment measures at the end of 2022. However, the economic cost of the pandemic was significant, with real gross domestic product growth falling from 13.8% in 2019 to -4.3 percent in 2020, although it recovered to 1.8% in 2021. Inflation rose to 11.5% in 2022, but inflation is projected to fall to 2.8% by 2028.

The increase in inflation in 2022 was due to the rapid rise in the cost of food resulting from a drought that affected food production and from rising global food prices, following Russia’s invasion of Ukraine (food imports represent 19 percent of Tuvalu’s GDP, while agriculture makes up for only 10 percent of GDP).

On 26 September 2023, the World Bank (WB) approved US$11.5 million (AUD$18 million) in new grant financing to Tuvalu as part of the WB’s First Climate and Disaster Resilience Development Policy Financing program. This WB support includes a development policy grant of US$7.5 million (AU$11.8 million). This grant is directed to assisting Tuvalu's National Disaster Management Office in coordinating post-disaster response activities; as well to the work of Tuvalu’s National Building Code Assessment Unit, of the Public Works Department, to develop more disaster-resilient infrastructure in Tuvalu.

==== Climate change initiatives ====
During his ministry, Tuvalu implemented the National Adaptation Programme of Action as a response to the climate change issues facing Tuvalu, including the Tuvalu Coastal Adaptation Project (TCAP). The Natano Ministry continued the constitutional reform project that had commenced in 2016 in the Sopoaga Ministry. On 5 September 2023, Tuvalu’s parliament passed the Constitution of Tuvalu Act 2023, with the changes to the Constitution came into effect on 1 October 2023.

The 2023 amendments to the Constitution adopt an innovative approach to determining the boundaries of the State of Tuvalu in the event that climate change results in sea level rise that causes loss to the physical territory of Tuvalu.

Section 2(1) states "The State of Tuvalu within its historical, cultural, and legal framework shall remain in perpetuity in the future, notwithstanding the impacts of climate change or other causes resulting in loss to the physical territory of Tuvalu."
Section 2(2) declares "The area of Tuvalu consists of all areas bounded by baseline coordinates including maritime zones measured from such baseline coordinates declared in Schedule 6 (Declaration of Tuvalu Geographical Coordinates)."

The government of Tuvalu recognises that there is no international conventions that it can rely on that can recognise Tuvalu's new status as the effects of climate change are not addressed in the UN Convention on the Law of the Sea.

Tuvalu, and other Pacific Ocean countries, support such a position on the impact on territorial boundaries caused by climate change. The leaders of the Pacific Islands Forum countries published a declaration on 6 August 2021 that recalled the Pacific Islands Forum Members as having a long history of support for the United Nations Convention on the Law of the Sea (the "Convention"), and which declaration ended with a proclamation: "that our maritime zones, as established and notified to the Secretary-General of the United Nations in accordance with the Convention, and the rights and entitlements that flow from them, shall continue to apply, without reduction, notwithstanding any physical changes connected to climate change-related sea-level rise."

==== Foreign policy ====
Following the 2019 election, Natano became Prime Minister, replacing the incumbent Enele Sopoaga, who was characterized as "pro-Taiwan." In the January 2024 election, Natano, who maintained the status quo, was now characterized as the "pro-Taiwan" candidate for leadership, with contender Seve Paeniu pledging during his election campaign to review Tuvalu's ties with Taiwan.

On 10 November 2023, Natano signed the Falepili Union, a bilateral diplomatic relationship with Australia, under which Australia will increase its contribution to the Tuvalu Trust Fund and to TCAP. Australia will also provide an pathway for citizens of Tuvalu to migrate to Australia, to enable climate-related mobility for Tuvaluans.

== Personal life ==
He is married to Selepa Kausea Natano.

Political offices
| Preceded by Enele Sopoaga | Prime Minister of Tuvalu; 2019–2024 | Succeeded by Feleti Teo |

== See also ==
- Politics of Tuvalu
- 2010 Tuvaluan general election
- Natano Ministry
