= List of Tuvalu MPs =

This is a list of the members of the Parliament of Tuvalu or Palamene o Tuvalu as elected at the 2024 Tuvaluan general election.

There are no formal parties in Tuvalu. The political system is based on personal alliances and loyalties derived from clan and family connections. The Parliament of Tuvalu is rare among national legislatures in that it is non-partisan in nature. It does tend to have both a distinct government and a distinct opposition.

On 26 February 2024, Feleti Teo was appointed as prime minister, after he was elected unopposed by the parliament. On 27 February, Sir Iakoba Italeli was elected as the Speaker of the Parliament of Tuvalu in an uncontested ballot. Teo also appointed the members of the Cabinet on 27 February.

Members elected for the first time at the 2024 general election are noted with *

== Members of Parliament elected in the 2024 general election ==
Constituency	Members	Faction	Notes
Funafuti	Tuafafa Latasi*	Government minister	
Funafuti	Simon Kofe	Government minister	
Nanumaga	Monise Lafai		
Nanumaga	Hamoa Holona*	Government minister	
Nanumea	Ampelosa Manoa Tehulu		
Nanumea	Timi Melei		
Niutao	Feleti Penitala Teo*	Prime minister	
Niutao	Saaga Talu Teafa	Government minister	
Nui	Mackenzie Kiritome		
Nui	Iakoba Italeli Taeia*	Speaker of the Parliament	
Nukufetau	Panapasi Nelesoni	Government minister	
Nukufetau	Enele Sopoaga		
Nukulaelae	Seve Paeniu		
Nukulaelae	Namoliki Sualiki		
Vaitupu	Paulson Panapa*	Government minister	
Vaitupu	Maina Talia*	Government minister	

Preceded by List of Tuvalu MPs, 2019–2024	Parliament of Tuvalu; 2024 general election	Succeeded by Incumbent MPs
