= Maina Talia =

Tuvaluan politician

The Honourable Dr. Maina Talia MP
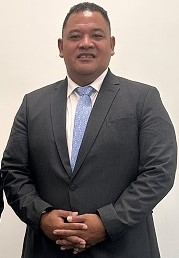
- Maina Talia in 2025

Minister for Home Affairs, Climate Change, and Environment
- Incumbent
- Assumed office 27 February 2024
- Prime Minister: Feleti Teo
- Preceded by: Sa'aga Talu Teafa (Home Affairs); Ampelosa Manoa Tehulu (Environment)

Member of Parliament
- Incumbent
- Assumed office 26 January 2024
- Constituency: Vaitupu

Personal details
- Party: Independent
- Education: Charles Sturt University

Maina Talia is a Tuvaluan politician and is known for his work as a climate activist. He trained in theology and was employed by the Christian Church of Tuvalu as a climate change officer from 2011 until June 2017.

== Climate change activism ==
From 2011, he has been the secretary of the Tuvalu Climate Action Network (TuCAN), also in 2011 he was appointed the National Focal point in Tuvalu for the Pacific Indigenous Network (PIN). He was the Tuvalu Association of NGOs Director from 2018 to 2020. He was involved in the formation of the Pacific Islands Climate Action Network (PICAN), and he has also served a two-year term as member of the Board of Directors of PICAN.

He was a member of the Tuvalu Government delegation to COP18 in Doha, COP21 in Paris, and COP23 in Bonn, and COP31 in Antalya.

== Political career ==
Talia was elected to represent Vaitupu in the 2024 general election. Talia was appointed the Minister for Home Affairs, Climate Change, and Environment in the Teo Ministry.

== Personal life ==
Maina Talia is married to Laingane Italeli Talia, the Attorney-General of Tuvalu. He has four children and grew up on Tuvalu's largest atoll, Vaitupu.
