= Teo ministry =

Cabinet of Tuvalu

Teo Ministry
- 16th Cabinet of Tuvalu

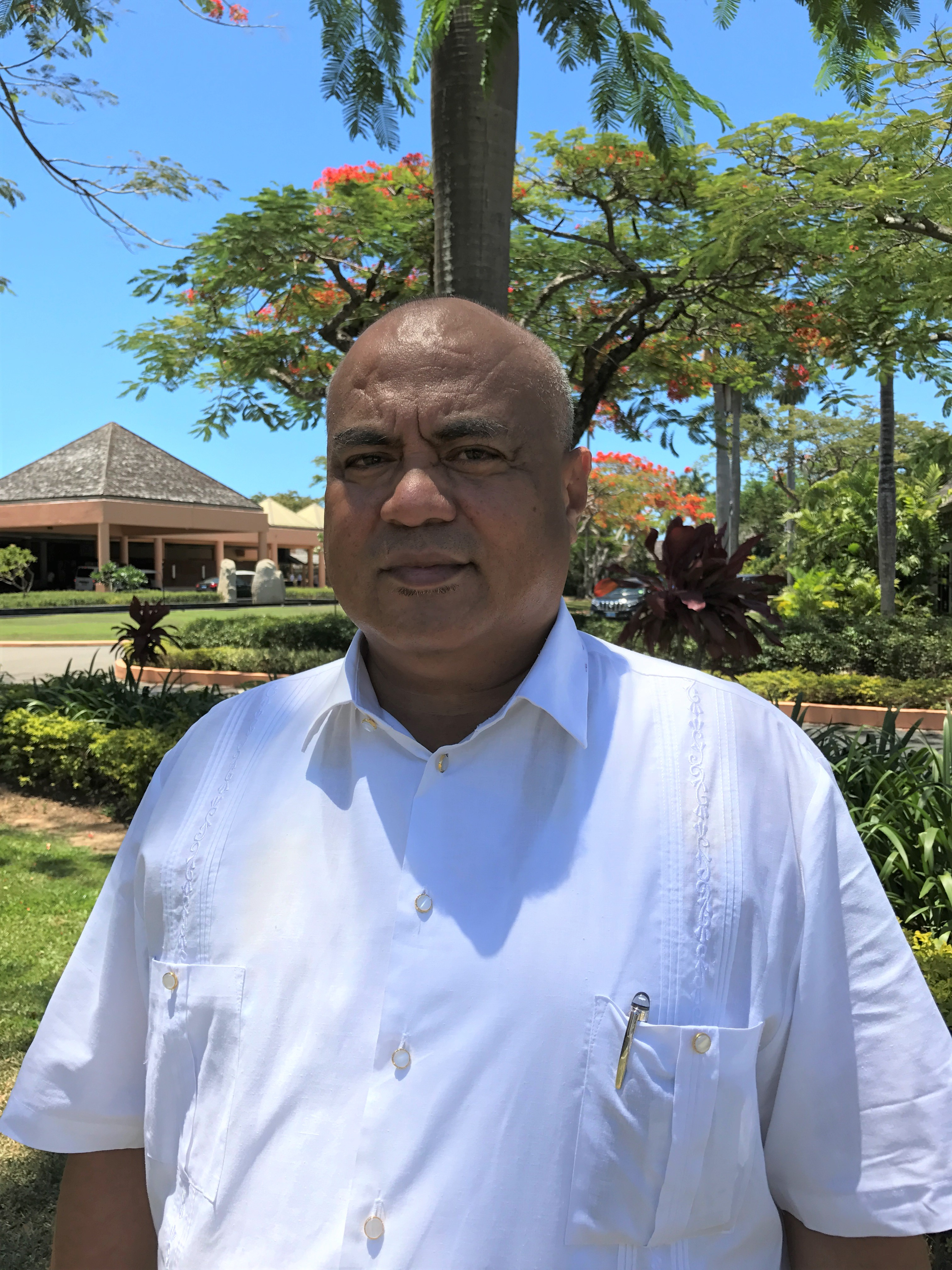
- Date formed: 26 February 2024

People and organisations
- Head of state: King Charles III (represented by the Rev. Sir Tofiga Vaevalu Falani & Temukisa Auina Penehuro Hauma)
- Head of government: Feleti Teo
- Member party: Independent
- Opposition leader: None

History
- Election: 2024 Tuvaluan general election
- Predecessor: Natano Ministry

The Teo Ministry is the 16th ministry of the Government of Tuvalu, led by Prime Minister Feleti Teo. It succeeded the Natano Ministry upon its swearing in by the Rev. Sir Tofiga Vaevalu Falani.

== Cabinet ==
Feleti Teo was appointed as prime minister on 26 February 2024, after he was elected unopposed by the parliament.

On 27 February, Sir Iakoba Italeli was elected as the Speaker of the Parliament of Tuvalu in an uncontested ballot.

Teo appointed the members of the Cabinet on 27 February.

Portfolio	Minister	Constituency	Notes
Prime Minister	Feleti Teo	Niutao	
Deputy Prime Minister & Minister of Finance and Development	Panapasi Nelesoni	Nukufetau	
Minister for Foreign Affairs, Labour, and Trade	Paulson Panapa	Vaitupu	
Minister for Home Affairs, Climate Change, and Environment	Dr. Maina Talia	Vaitupu	
Minister for Transport, Energy, Communication, and Innovation	Simon Kofe	Funafuti	
Minister for Natural Resources Development	Sa'aga Talu Teafa	Niutao	
Minister for Health and Social Welfare	Tuafafa Latasi	Funafuti	
Minister for Education and Human Resources Development	Hamoa Holona	Nanumaga	
