= Hamoa Holona =

Tuvaluan politician

The Honourable Hamoa Holona MP

Minister for Education and Human Resources Development
- Incumbent
- Assumed office 27 February 2024
- Prime Minister: Feleti Teo
- Preceded by: Timi Melei

Member of Parliament
- Incumbent
- Assumed office 26 January 2024
- Preceded by: Kitiona Tausi
- Constituency: Nanumanga

Personal details
- Party: Independent
- Education: University of the South Pacific (USP)

Hamoa Holona is a Tuvaluan politician. He was previously a civil servant. He was the Deputy Secretary of the Ministry of Local Government.

He attended Ratu Kadavulevu School, Tailevu, Fiji and the University of the South Pacific, Faculty of Business and Economics. In 2005 he was the President of the National Council of Youth of Tuvalu. In 2013 he was the manager of the Tuvalu national football team’s tour of the Netherlands.

== Political career ==
He was elected to the Parliament of Tuvalu in the 2024 Tuvaluan general election to represent Nanumanga. He was appointed as the Minister for Education and Human Resources Development in the Teo Ministry.
