= Meltdown (Clearfield and Tilcsik book) =

2018 book by Chris Clearfield and András Tilcsik

- U.S. hardcover edition
- Author: Chris Clearfield, András Tilcsik
- Cover artist: Christopher King
- Language: English
- Subject: Failure, Systems, Sociology
- Genre: Non-fiction
- Publisher: Penguin Press, Atlantic Books, Penguin Random House Canada
- Publication date: March 20, 2018
- Publication place: United States
- Media type: Hardcover, paperback, audiobook
- Pages: 304 pg.
- ISBN: 9780735222632
- OCLC: 993419323
- Dewey Decimal: 158.1
- LC Class: HM701 .C54 2018

Meltdown: Why Our Systems Fail and What We Can Do About It is a non-fiction book by Chris Clearfield and András Tilcsik, published in March 2018 by Penguin Press. It explores how complexity causes problems in modern systems and how individuals, organizations, and societies can prevent or mitigate the resulting failures. Meltdown was named a best book of the year by the Financial Times and won Canada's National Business Book Award in 2019.

== Background ==
The book is the result of a collaboration between Chris Clearfield, a former derivatives trader, and András Tilcsik, a professor at the University of Toronto's Rotman School of Management. Clearfield and Tilcsik took top honors in the 2015 competition for The Financial Times and McKinsey Bracken Bower Prize with their proposal for a book about how to understand systemic risk and prevent catastrophic failures in business and beyond. The following year, they signed with Penguin Press to publish Meltdown.

== Synopsis ==
The first three chapters of the book extend Charles Perrow’s normal accident theory—originally developed in the 1980s—to recent trends, such as the rise of social media, the increasing reliance of organizations on computer-based systems, and the growing complexity of modern financial, transportation, and communication systems. The authors warn that companies, governments, and even individuals have become dangerously reliant on complex, tightly coupled systems and are ignoring simple fixes that could avert both accidents and intentional wrongdoing.

Each of the remaining chapters focuses on a different set of solutions: designing more transparent and loosely coupled systems (Chapter 4); using structured decision tools (Chapter 5); learning from near misses and other warning signs (Chapter 6); encouraging dissent and skepticism (Chapter 7); building diverse teams (Chapter 8); learning from outsiders (Chapter 9); and preparing for and managing crises more effectively (Chapter 10).

In the epilogue, the authors state that humanity is in "the golden age of meltdowns": though modern systems give us tremendous capabilities, they also make us vulnerable to unexpected system failures. Clearfield and Tilcsik, however, express optimism about the future and argue that the solutions are within reach. At the same time, they caution that putting the necessary solutions into practice is difficult because doing so often goes against our natural instincts and violates persistent organizational and cultural norms.

== Style ==
The book combines analyses of case studies with summaries of social science research, drawing on academic studies, accident reports, and original interviews. The case studies include, for example, a failed social media campaign at Starbucks, a Thanksgiving dinner gone awry, the Three Mile Island nuclear accident, the Flint water crisis, Nasdaq’s botched handling of the Facebook IPO, the accidents of the space shuttles Challenger and Columbia, the electronic trading meltdown of Knight Capital, the crashes of flights ValuJet 592 and Air France 447, and the June 2009 Washington Metro train collision. The academic research covered in the book comes from sociology, psychology, behavioural economics, organizational theory, and neuroscience, including studies by Charles Perrow, Diane Vaughan, Karl Weick, Amy Edmondson, Dacher Keltner, Gary Klein, Gregory Berns, Daniel Kahneman, and Georg Simmel, among others.

== Reception ==
The Financial Times called Meltdown "an exciting and insightful analysis of why things go wrong and how to avoid catastrophe" and selected it as one of the books of 2018. David A. Shaywitz, reviewing the book in The Wall Street Journal, concluded that "Meltdown effectively conveys why addressing systemic failures is both difficult and essential: difficult because it’s so much more comfortable to rely on gut instinct and trust familiar colleagues than to insist on structured approaches and solicit the views of others; essential because we are moving into the danger zone and need all the help we can get." Shaywitz called the book’s examples "illuminating" and noted that "where Meltdown really hits its stride is in taking on the factors that promote groupthink and discourage dissent."

Leigh Buchanan, editor-at-large at Inc. magazine, named Meltdown as one of the "eight books you need to read in 2018" and described it as "admirably evidence-based." Tim Harford picked Meltdown as one of his books of 2019, writing that "Meltdown is fun, wide-ranging, vivid and full of clever observations.... I strongly recommend the book." Writing for Forbes.com, Brook Manville called Meltdown "a thought-provoking new book" and wrote that the authors "colorfully explain why your job, like everyone else’s in today’s global economy, is becoming part of bigger networks of co-dependent systems, laden with unforeseeable risks and unimaginable outcomes." Kirkus Reviews described Meltdown as "a useful, thought-provoking book" and "a cautionary study in how complex systems can easily go awry". CBS This Morning co-host John Dickerson called the book "really interesting" and "a great new book." In a book review for Strategy+Business, Theodore Kinni wrote that "Meltdown is something of a rarity: an enlightening and entertaining business book. It synthesizes the work of experts in high-risk systems ... and builds upon it in an accessible and practical way."

The National Business Book Award committee praised Meltdown for presenting "an innovative and engaging account of how seemingly unconnected disasters in the nuclear, medical and transportation sectors (to name a few) share common causes" and "applying leading-edge social sciences research with riveting real life stories... [to] explain how the increasing complexity of our systems create conditions ripe for failure and how our brains can't keep up."

Meltdown received the George R. Terry Book Award of the Academy of Management, granted annually to "the book judged to have made the most outstanding contribution to the global advancement of management knowledge during the last two years." The selection committee noted that the book is "both a riveting read accessible to a wide audience, and at the same time, a thoroughly documented contribution to the understanding of organizational failure." The book also won the Thinkers50 Strategy Award in 2019 and was described as "one of the stand-out business books of the last decade."

== Bibliography ==
- Clearfield, Chris; Tilcsik, András (2018). Meltdown: Why Our Systems Fail and What We Can Do About It. New York: Penguin Press. ISBN 9780735222632.
