= Making Social Science Matter =

2001 book by Bent Flyvbjerg

- Author: Bent Flyvbjerg
- Subject: Social sciences
- Genre: Non-fiction
- Published: 2001 (Cambridge University Press)
- Pages: 216
- ISBN: 978-0-521-77268-6

Making Social Science Matter: Why Social Inquiry Fails and How It Can Succeed Again is a 2001 book by Bent Flyvbjerg, published by Cambridge University Press. The author is critical of social sciences to the extent they try to emulate natural science. First, he argues that social sciences have failed as science, that is, in producing predictive theory. Second, he develops an argument that in order to matter again, social sciences must model themselves after phronesis (as opposed to episteme, which is at the core of natural science). Finally, he develops methodological guidelines and shows practical examples of how a phronetic social science may be employed for research purposes.

Flyvbjerg rejects the natural science model as an ideal for the social sciences and suggests that social sciences are more relevant to people, e.g., ordinary citizens and policy makers. Flyvbjerg argues that to gain relevance, social science must inform practical reason; accordingly, this is best done by a focus on values and power. In terms of philosophy and history of science, Flyvbjerg is influenced by Aristotle rather than by Socrates and Plato.

Flyvbjerg's book Rationality and Power: Democracy in Practice is an example of the methodology and theory developed in Making Social Science Matter employed in practice. Flyvbjerg has also explained how he uses the methodology in his studies of megaprojects.

== Reception ==
Science Magazine published a review of Making Social Science Matter, by Clifford Geertz of the Princeton Institute for Advanced Study. Geertz commented: "Bent Flyvbjerg has been one of the leading figures in the now widespread movement against the idea that the social sciences should model themselves on the natural ones ... [Making Social Science Matter] clearly demonstrates that there are models more appropriate to the social sciences ... Flyvbjerg's suggestive, well-written little book both reviews most of the apparent possibilities and establishes standards (practical and political, ethical and methodological) by which to measure their progress."

In Choice magazine, W. P. Nye wrote: "This is a bold manifesto calling for a radical reorientation of social science research ... Flyvbjerg offers a strong case for his main thesis and, therefore, this work deserves wide and serious attention among social scientists and social policy planners and implementers."

According to Caterino and Schram, "The special thing about Flyvbjerg's challenge to social science is the way it bridges theory and practice in a way that unites philosophical and empirical subdivisions in the social sciences."
