= Bent Flyvbjerg =

Danish economic geographer

Academic work
- Discipline: Economic geography
- Institutions: University of Oxford; Delft University of Technology; IT University of Copenhagen

Bent Flyvbjerg is a Danish economic geographer. He is the Villum Kann Rasmussen Professor at the IT University of Copenhagen.

== Education and career ==
Flyvbjerg received his Ph.D. in urban geography and planning from Aarhus University, Denmark, with parts done at the University of California at Los Angeles.

He was the first BT Professor and inaugural chair of major programme management at Oxford University's Saïd Business School (retiring from the post in 2021) before coming to IT University of Copenhagen and becoming the chair of major program management there. He was previously a professor of planning at Aalborg University, Denmark and chair of the department of infrastructure policy and planning at Delft University of Technology, The Netherlands. He is a fellow of St Anne's College, Oxford.

He was a member of the Danish Infrastructure Commission and a director of the Danish Court Administration.

He has written extensively about megaprojects, decision making, city management, and philosophy of social science. His research falls in three main areas: the philosophy and methodology of the social sciences, power and rationality in decision making, and megaproject planning and management.

== Books ==
- 1998 Rationality and Power: Democracy in Practice, University of Chicago Press (ISBN 0226254518)
- 2001 Making Social Science Matter: Why Social Inquiry Fails and How It Can Succeed Again, Cambridge University Press (ISBN 0-521-77568-X)
- 2003 Megaprojects and Risk: An Anatomy of Ambition. Cambridge University Press (ISBN 0-521-00946-4)
- 2008 Decision-Making on Mega-Projects: Cost-Benefit Analysis, Planning and Innovation, Elgar (ISBN 978-1-84542-737-5)
- 2012 Real Social Science: Applied Phronesis, Cambridge University Press (ISBN 978-0-521-16820-5)
- 2014 Megaproject Planning and Management: Essential Readings, Volumes I-II, Elgar (ISBN 978-1-78100-170-7)
- 2017 The Oxford Handbook of Megaproject Management, Oxford University Press (ISBN 978-0-19873-224-2)
- 2023 How Big Things Get Done, Penguin Random House (ISBN 978-0-593239513)
