= 2024 Tuvaluan general election =

- 26 January 2024

All 16 seats in Parliament
| | First party |
|---|---|
| Party | Independents |
| Last election | 16 |
| Seats after | 16 |
Prime Minister before election
Kausea Natano
Subsequent
Prime Minister
Feleti Teo

General elections were held in Tuvalu on 26 January 2024. There are no political parties in Tuvalu and all candidates run as independents.

Two major issues in the election were the Falepili Union treaty, which requiries both Tuvalu and Australia to "mutually agree" Tuvalu's foreign security arrangements in exchange for allowing Tuvaluans displaced by climate change to immigrate to Australia, and the country's diplomatic recognition of Taiwan within the context of great power competition between the United States and China for influence in the region.

Feleti Teo was appointed as prime minister on 26 February 2024 after having been elected unopposed by the parliament.

== Background ==
The previous elections in 2019 saw a high turnover among the 16 members of parliament, seven of whom were the first-term members. Several cabinet ministers lost their seats. There were two female candidates, and Puakena Boreham retained a seat in parliament. In the vote for prime minister, held shortly after the election, parliament elected Kausea Natano, defeating the incumbent head of government Enele Sopoaga, who had served since 2013. The defeat of Sopoaga, who was pro-Taiwan, caused some to speculate that the new prime minister would sever ties with Taipei in favour of China. The Solomon Islands, another Pacific Islands country, had made the switch days before. However, Prime Minister Natano later assured that Tuvalu would maintain its diplomatic ties and recognition of Taiwan. As of 2024, Tuvalu is one of only 12 countries that have official diplomatic relations with Taiwan.

=== Falepili Union treaty ===
In November 2023 Prime Minister Natano signed the Falepili Union treaty with Australia. A significant factor of the treaty grants a pathway for 280 citizens of Tuvalu to migrate to Australia each year to enable climate-related mobility for Tuvaluans. In exchange, the agreement allows Australia an effective veto power over Tuvalu's foreign security agreements as the 2 countries must "mutually agree" such security agreements. Natano said the treaty was essential in preserving Tuvalu's identity. However, former Prime Minister Sopoaga claimed the Falepili Union would undermine the country's sovereignty and vowed to repeal it should he head a government again after the election. Sopoaga emphasised the sensitivity of conserving the sovereignty of the Pacific Island nations amidst a period where bigger countries, such as the United States and China, are competing for influence in the region. Former Foreign Minister Simon Kofe also criticised the treaty and pledged to renegotiate with Australia. Kofe highlighted Tuvalu's contracts with numerous international companies, including those that provide the country with satellite connections and questioned if it were necessary for Tuvalu to require Australia's permission to engage with such companies.

== Electoral system ==
The 16 members of parliament are elected from eight two-seat constituencies via plurality block voting. There are no formal political parties in Tuvalu, so all candidates contest as independents. Candidates are required to be Tuvaluan citizens and at least 21 years old. If, by the registration deadline, no more than two eligible candidates have registered to run in a constituency, these nominees are then, on that day, declared by law to be elected. Candidates have until the day before the election to withdraw if they wish to. All citizens aged 18 and older are eligible to vote; voting is not compulsory. There were about 6,000 eligible voters in this election.

== Results ==
Voting began on 26 January 2024 at 08:00, concluding at 16:00. The elections officer said turnout was high as voting commenced.

Six new MPs were elected. Significant changes to the composition of the parliament included the incumbent Prime Minister Kausea Natano and Puakena Boreham – the only female member of the legislature – losing their seats. The former Governor General Sir Iakoba Italeli was elected as an MP along with Feleti Teo, the former Executive Director of the Western and Central Pacific Fisheries Commission (WCPFC).

Enele Sopoaga, the prime minister from 2013 to 2019, was re-elected in the Nukufetau electorate. Former foreign minister Simon Kofe retained his seat in the Funafuti electorate.

No candidates contested the sitting MPs Seve Paeniu, who was the finance minister, and Namoliki Sualiki in the electorate of Nukulaelae, so they were automatically returned to parliament.

| Constituency | Candidate | Votes | % | Notes |
|---|---|---|---|---|
| Funafuti | Tuafafa Latasi | 351 | 31.08 | Elected |
| Funafuti | Simon Kofe | 348 | 30.82 | Re-elected |
| Funafuti | Kausea Natano | 331 | 29.32 | Unseated |
| Funafuti | Iosua Samasoni | 53 | 4.70 | |
| Funafuti | Luke Paeniu | 37 | 0.13 | |
| Funafuti | Jack Mataio Taleka | 9 | 0.8 | |
| Nanumanga | Monise Laafai | 292 | 29.95 | Re-elected |
| Nanumanga | Hamoa Holona | 265 | 27.18 | Elected |
| Nanumanga | Malofou Sopoaga | 251 | 25.74 | |
| Nanumanga | Kitiona Tausi | 167 | 17.13 | Unseated |
| Nanumea | Ampelosa Manoa Tehulu | 490 | 36.57 | Re-elected |
| Nanumea | Timi Melei | 296 | 22.09 | Re-elected |
| Nanumea | Temetiu Maliga | 246 | 18.34 | |
| Nanumea | Satini Manuella | 178 | 13.28 | |
| Nanumea | Falasese Tupou | 130 | 9.70 | |
| Niutao | Feleti Teo | 581 | 46.40 | Elected |
| Niutao | Sa'aga Talu Teafa | 499 | 39.85 | Re-elected |
| Niutao | Samuelu Teo | 172 | 13.74 | Unseated |
| Nui | Mackenzie Kiritome | 352 | 36.90 | Re-elected |
| Nui | Iakoba Italeli | 311 | 32.60 | Elected |
| Nui | Puakena Boreham | 291 | 30.50 | Unseated |
| Nukufetau | Panapasi Nelesoni | 408 | 27.05 | Re-elected |
| Nukufetau | Enele Sopoaga | 402 | 26.65 | Re-elected |
| Nukufetau | Taimitasi Paelati | 374 | 24.80 | |
| Nukufetau | Nikolasi Apenelu | 324 | 21.48 | |
| Nukulaelae | Seve Paeniu | – | – | Re-elected (uncontested) |
| Nukulaelae | Namoliki Sualiki | – | – | Re-elected (uncontested) |
| Vaitupu | Paulson Panapa | 585 | 32.46 | Elected |
| Vaitupu | Maina Talia | 448 | 24.86 | Elected |
| Vaitupu | Nielu Meisake | 420 | 23.30 | Unseated |
| Vaitupu | Isaia Taape | 349 | 19.36 | Unseated |

== Aftermath ==
After the results are released, ships were sent to pick up winning candidates in order for them to assemble in the capital Funafuti, although dangerous sea conditions delayed their travel. Election commissioner Tufoua Panapa said that the members of the new parliament would convene to vote for a prime minister, at a time notified by the governor general.

There are three groups of MPs in the new parliament: six newly elected members; six members of the last government; and four from the previous opposition group.

On 26 February 2024, Feleti Teo was appointed as prime minister, after he was elected unopposed by the parliament, and on 27 February 2024 Teo appointed the members of the Cabinet.

Teo was a member of the eminent persons panel which worked with the governments of Tuvalu and Australia to draft the Falepili Union. In a statement published by Simon Kofe on 28 February 2024, the Teo government gave support for the "broad principles and objectives" of the Falepili Union, while noting "the absence of transparency and consultations in socializing and informing the public in Tuvalu of such an important and groundbreaking initiative"; and indicated that Tuvalu will seek changes to make it "workable".

The statement of 28 February 2024 also address Tuvalu's relations with Taiwan: "The new government wishes to reaffirm its commitment to the long-term and lasting special relationship between Tuvalu and the Republic of China, Taiwan".

In his first interview as prime minister, Teo said "[o]ur ties with Taiwan are purely based on democratic principles and they have been very loyal to us." Teo said the part of the Falepili Union he wanted to revisit was that both countries must "mutually agree" on any security arrangements that Tuvalu may want with other countries.

In a later interview Teo said that “[i]f there is a way that stops short of revising the treaty that guarantees the integrity of the sovereignty of Tuvalu, then we will certainly explore those options.” Subsequently Teo said he wanted arrangements to guarantee Tuvalu’s sovereignty that "stop short of revising the treaty."

Teo has said that his government's top priority was climate change, and the development challenges Tuvalu faces include the need to improve medical and educational services to Tuvalu’s outer islands.

== Reactions ==
After the formation of the new government, the Taiwanese Ministry of Foreign Affairs, officially the Ministry of Foreign Affairs of the Republic of China, sent a presidential delegation led by Deputy Foreign Minister Tien Chung-kwang to Tuvalu as a show of support for newly elected Prime Minister Feleti Teo.

The Australian foreign minister Penny Wong said that the country looked forward to working with the new government. Australia’s Department of Foreign Affairs and Trade responded to the concerns about the Falepili Union by saying the treaty “recognises that the statehood and sovereignty of Tuvalu will continue”. On 26 March 2024, Pat Conroy, Australia’s Pacific minister, tabled the Falepili Union treaty in the Australian Parliament for the propose of obtaining ratification of the treaty. Conroy stated “[t]he new government of Tuvalu has confirmed its desire to proceed with the Falepili Union”. Conroy confirmed that Australia would work with Tuvalu to ensure its sovereignty was respected. Conroy also stated that “Australia commits to assist Tuvalu in responding to a major natural disaster, a health pandemic, or military aggression. This is predicated on Tuvalu requesting such assistance.”
