= Paulson Panapa =

Tuvaluan politician

The Honourable Paulson Panapa MP
- Panapa in Taiwan in September 2026

Minister for Foreign Affairs, Labour, and Trade
- Incumbent
- Assumed office 26 February
- Prime Minister: Feleti Teo
- Preceded by: Panapasi Nelesoni

Member of Parliament
- Incumbent
- Assumed office 26 January 2024
- Constituency: Vaitupu

Personal details
- Born: 23 February 1967 Tarawa
- Party: Independent

Paulson Panapa (born 1967) is a Tuvaluan politician and has been a civil servant and diplomat. From 6 June 2014, he represented Tuvalu as the High Commissioner to Fiji. He was subsequently appointed as the High Commissioner to New Zealand from February 2017.

Panapa was Assistant Clerk of the Tuvalu parliament from 1991 to 1995 and Clerk from 1995 to 2004. In 2010 Panapa was the Secretary for Works, Water and Energy. Panapa has held other roles as a senior civil servant, including in 2011 as Secretary for Education, Youth and Sports. He was also a Tuvaluan sports director.

== Sporting career ==
He was educated at Motufoua Secondary School where he played in the 1st Eleven football Team in 1982–1984. He was a midfield player (2008–2009) and trainer of F.C. Tofaga. Panapa was president of the Tuvalu Islands Football Association (TIFA), from 2001 to 2005. He was also chairman of TIFA from 2010 to 2014. Under his leadership, TIFA was actively trying to gain membership of FIFA. Panapa is the father of George Panapa and uncle of James Lepaio who plays for the Tuvalu national football team.

== Political career ==
He was elected to parliament to represent Vaitupu in the 2024 general election. Panapa was appointed the Minister for Foreign Affairs, Labour, and Trade in the Teo Ministry.

Political offices
Preceded by Panapasi Nelesoni	Foreign Minister of Tuvalu; 2024 to present	Incumbent

== Published work ==
- Paulson Panapa & Jon Fraenkel (2008). "The Loneliness of the Pro-Government Backbencher and the Precariousness of Simple Majority Rule in Tuvalu" (PDF). SSGM Discussion Paper 2008/2. Canberra, ACT: ANU Research School of Pacific and Asian Studies, State, Society and Governance in Melanesia Program. Archived from the original (PDF) on 2016-03-04.
