= Philip Selznick =

American organizational theorist (1919–2010)

- Born: January 8, 1919; Newark, New Jersey, US
- Died: June 12, 2010 (aged 91); Berkeley, California, US

Academic background
- Education: City College of New York; Columbia University
- Thesis: TVA and the Grass Roots (1947)
- Doctoral advisor: Robert K. Merton

Academic work
- Institutions: UCLA; University of California, Berkeley
- Doctoral students: Charles Perrow; Arthur Stinchcombe; Bob Blauner; Katherine Newman

Philip Selznick (January 8, 1919 – June 12, 2010) was an American organizational theorist, a professor of sociology and law at the University of California, Berkeley. A noted author in organizational theory, sociology of law and public administration, Selznick's work was groundbreaking in several fields in such books as The Moral Commonwealth, TVA and the Grass Roots and Leadership in Administration.

== Career ==
Selznick was born in Newark, New Jersey and earned a bachelor's degree from City College of New York in 1938. He received his MA in sociology from Columbia University in 1942, but his graduate studies were interrupted by military service during World War II from 1943 to 1946, when he worked as a research analyst in the Philippines and Japan. After the war, Selznick finally received his PhD in sociology in 1947 from Columbia University. After his graduation, he joined University of California, Los Angeles as an assistant professor in sociology and worked there until 1952. He was on the faculty of the University of California, Berkeley, between 1952 and 1984, initially with the Department of Sociology and later with the School of Law as well.

== Major contributions ==
Selznick was a major proponent of the neo-classical organizational theory movement starting in the 1930s. One of his most influential papers, entitled "Foundations of the Theory of Organization" (1948), laid out his major contributions to organization theory.

=== Individuals as independent agents ===
In simplified form, Selznick postulated that individuals within organizations can hold dichotomous goal-sets, which makes it difficult for organizations and employees to have the same implicit, rational objectives (as theorized in classical organization movement which was a precursor of Selznick's work).

=== Cooptation theory ===
Selznick's principle of cooptation is an important precursor to the later developments of organizational ecology and contingency theory.

=== Sociology of law ===
Selznick has been a major contributor to the sociology of law, developing his ideas on legal institutions and their problems and possibilities of responsiveness to their constituencies, from his earlier work on the sociology of formal organizations.

Selznick once wrote that the "law is a significant vehicle of social change" adding that "the question is no longer whether law is a significant vehicle of social change but rather how it so functions".

Selznick said the legitimacy of laws as secondary norms of sanction presupposed the recognition of a relevant primary norm:

The appeal from an asserted rule, however coercively enforced, to a justified rule is the elementary legal act. This presumes at least a dim awareness that some reason lies behind the impulse to conform, a reason founded not in conscience, habit or fear alone, but in the decision to uphold an authoritative order. The rule of legal recognition may be quite blunt and crude: the law is what the king or priest says it is. But this initial reference of a primary norm to a ground of obligation breeds the complex elaboration of authoritative rules that marks a developed legal order.

=== Theories of mass society ===
Selznick was first – anticipating Daniel Bell, Edward Shils, Talcott Parsons, William Kornhauser, and a host of American social scientists – to attack the then prevailing theory of mass society. His approach argued instead that there were two analytically distinct theoretical approaches to mass society:

- there were those who were critics of equalitarianism or who emphasized the role of creative and culture-bearing elites;
- but there were also those who emphasized social disintegration and the quality of participation in mass society and mass organizations.

The first group of theorists is best represented by José Ortega y Gasset and Karl Mannheim. Each of these theorists located the cause of the advent of mass society in the decline of the social position of creative elites who were responsible for the development and the strength of cultural values. Mass society arose when society was no longer directed by an identifiable and stable structure of elites, when the vulgar appetites of the masses supplanted "the canons of refinement and sober restraint." The masses cannot simply take over the role served previously by elites; they can express desires but not values.

The second group of mass society theorists, those who emphasized social disintegration and the quality of participation, was best represented by Emil Lederer, Erich Fromm, and Sigmund Neumann. Selznick argued that these theorists leave the role of elites largely unexamined. They defined mass society as the era of mass man, a type defined not in terms of any relationship to a formally superior or intrinsically more qualified elite, but as the expression of a wider social disintegration. The homogeneous, amorphous, and undifferentiated individuals in the mass resulted from radical social changes which rendered old norms obsolete and old roles meaningless. Psychological deterioration followed on social disorganization: 'as family, church, and traditional political ties weaken, a psychological atomization takes place.' This type of mass society theory pictures society as a crowd in which irrational, emotional acts predominate. "The readiness for manipulation by symbols, especially those permitting sado-masochistic releases, is characteristic of the mass as of the crowd."

== Selected publications ==
- Selznick, Philip (1943). "An Approach to a Theory of Bureaucracy". American Sociological Review. 8 (1): 47–54. doi:10.2307/2085448. JSTOR 2085448.
- Selznick, Philip (1948). "Foundations of the Theory of Organization". American Sociological Review. 13 (1): 25–35. doi:10.2307/2086752. JSTOR 2086752.
- Selznick, Philip (1949). TVA and the Grass Roots: a Study in the Sociology of Formal Organization. Berkeley: University of California Press. OCLC 2293803.
- Selznick, Philip (1957). Leadership in Administration: a Sociological Interpretation. Evanston, IL: Row, Peterson. OCLC 4800611.
- Selznick, Philip (1960). The Organizational Weapon: a Study of Bolshevik Strategy and Tactics. Glencoe, IL: Free Press. OCLC 1558918.
- Selznick, Philip; Nonet, Philippe; Vollmer, Howard M. (1969). Law, Society, and Industrial Justice. New York: Russell Sage Foundation. OCLC 62067.
- Selznick, Philip (1992). The Moral Commonwealth: Social Theory and the Promise of Community. Berkeley: University of California Press. ISBN 0520052463.
- Selznick, Philip (1996). "Institutionalism 'Old' and 'New'". Administrative Science Quarterly. 41 (2): 270–277. doi:10.2307/2393719. JSTOR 2393719.
- Nonet, Philippe; Selznick, Philip (2001). Law and Society in Transition: Toward Responsive Law. New Brunswick, NJ: Transaction Publishers. ISBN 0765806428.
