= Chen Ming-chi =

Diplomat of Taiwan

- 陳明祺
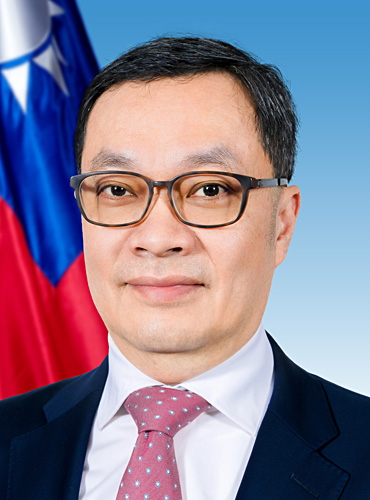

Deputy Minister of Foreign Affairs
- Incumbent
- Assumed office February 20, 2025
- Preceded by: Tien Chung-kwang

Personal details
- Education: National Taiwan University (BA); Yale University (MA, PhD); City University of New York (PhD)

Chen Ming-chi (Chinese: 陳明祺) is a Taiwanese sociologist and diplomat who has served as Deputy Minister of Foreign Affairs since February 20, 2025. He previously served as the deputy minister of the Mainland Affairs Council from July 2018 to June 2022 during the presidency of Tsai Ing-wen.

== Education ==
Chen graduated from National Taiwan University with a Bachelor of Arts (B.A.) in sociology in 1988. He then completed graduate studies in the United States at Yale University, where he earned his Master of Arts (M.A.) in sociology in 1998 and his Ph.D. in sociology in 2002 on a Coca-Cola Scholarship. His doctoral dissertation was titled, "Industrial District and Social Capital in Taiwan's Economic Development: An Economic Sociological Study on Taiwan's Bicycle Industry," and was supervised by professor Charles Perrow. He also concurrently completed a second doctorate in sociology at the City University of New York.

== Academic career ==
After receiving his doctorate, Chen became an assistant professor of sociology at National Taipei University in August 2002, then moved to National Tsing Hua University (NTHU), where he became a professor in three different departments: the Institute of Sociology (February 2005 – June 2018), the Institute of Technology Management (February 2006 – June 2018), and the Institute of Service Science (February 2008 – June 2018).

== Ministry of Foreign Affairs (2025–) ==
At the invitation of Lin Chia-lung, Chen succeeded Tien Chung-kwang as the deputy minister of foreign affairs on February 20, 2025.

== Personal life ==
Chen has a daughter, Allison.
