= Kulia =

Populated place in Niutao, Tuvalu

Coordinates: 6°07′S 177°17′E

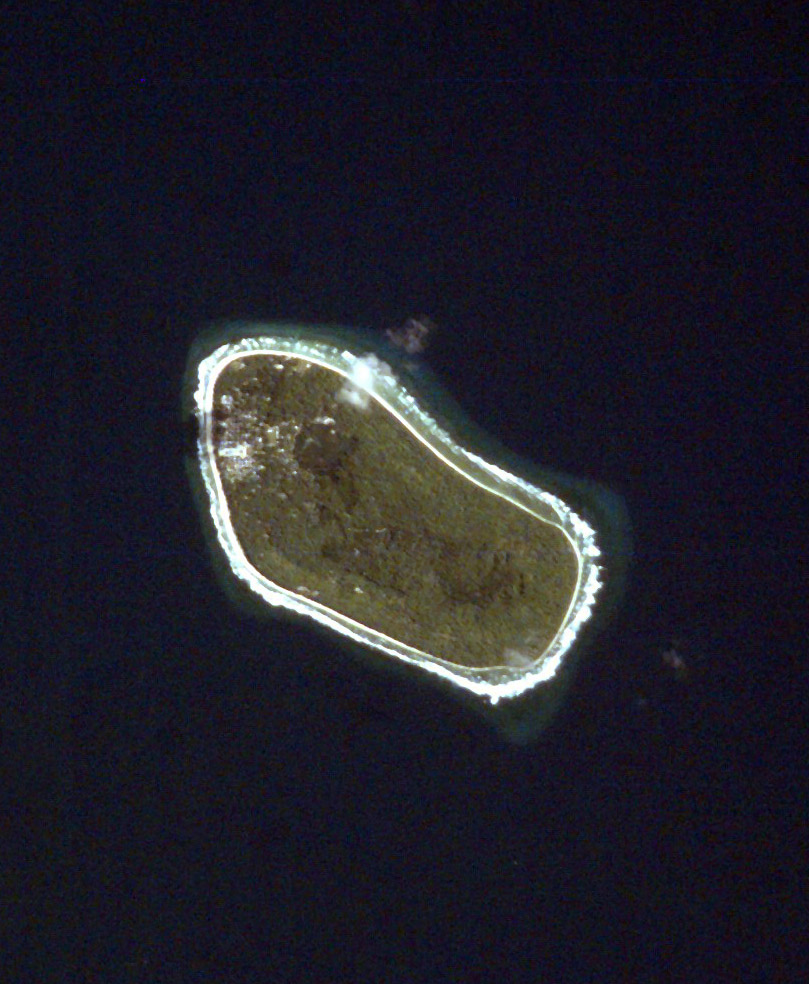
NASA astronaut image of Niutao Island

Kulia is the administrative center and capital of the district of Niutao in the Pacific island state of Tuvalu. Kulia is located in the west of the main island of Niutao. The place has 224 inhabitants as of 2010. Historically, Kulia was known as Tuapa.

Kulia has a church of Te Ekalesia Kelisiano Tuvalu, a post office, and school.
