= When Technology Fails =

1994 collection of 103 case studies edited by Neil Schlager

- Author: Neil Y. Schlager (ed.)
- Language: English
- Subject: Reference
- Publisher: Gale Research
- Publication date: January 1994
- Publication place: United States
- Pages: 659
- ISBN: 978-0-8103-8908-3
- OCLC: 29315606
- Dewey Decimal: 363.1 W574

When Technology Fails, edited by Neil Schlager, is a collection of 103 case studies about significant technological disasters, accidents, and failures of the 20th century. It was published in 1994 by Gale Research, Inc. It was one of the top referenced books in the New York Public Library in 1995. The book was updated and re-released in 2005.

The book consists of 1,000- to 1,500-word entries, arranged by subject, that discuss the background, timeline, and impact of each event. Each entry is written by journalists, engineers, and researchers, and provides a cursory overview, rather than in-depth technological analysis. Entries are supplemented by bibliographies, black-and-white photographs, charts, and other print media.

== See also ==
- Normal Accidents
- Megaprojects and Risk
- Northeast Blackout of 2003
- Brittle Power
- Fukushima nuclear disaster
