= Rationality and Power =

1998 book by Bent Flyvbjerg

- Cover
- Author: Bent Flyvbjerg
- Language: English
- Publisher: University of Chicago Press
- Publication date: 1998
- Publication place: United States
- Media type: Print
- ISBN: 0-226-25451-8
- OCLC: 300447950
- Dewey Decimal: 320.4489/5 21
- LC Class: JS6185.A53 F5913 1998

Rationality and Power: Democracy in Practice is a 1998 book by Bent Flyvbjerg, published by the University of Chicago Press. The book focuses on "the application of critical theory to urban and community development". Flyvbjerg here deploys the methodology for doing social science, which he developed in Making Social Science Matter (2001).

== Synopsis ==
Flyvbjerg focuses on the study of how power influences rationality and democracy. He specifically highlights Machiavelli's power studies in Florence as a source of influence for the choice of in-depth case studies to understand the dynamics of power and how power enables and constrains rationality and rational government. Flyvbjerg also develops and identifies "ten propositions about rationality and power" that can be used as grounded theory when researching rationality, power, and democracy.

== Reception ==
Upon publication, the International Journal of Urban and Regional Research called Rationality and Power "a notable addition to the literature," the reviewer adding, "I cannot think of a better account of how power relations are embodied in local governance."

The Times Literary Supplement wrote: "the monumental tedium of its narrative, its picayune Legoland quality, is the book's great strength. This serves Flyvbjerg's argumentative purposes admirably ... Flyvbjerg's genius lies in his unfailing eye for banality, and for discerning the none too invisible hand of power behind it ... Town planning is the continuation of war by other means. For Flyvbjerg, what is real is not rational, but rationalization ... a world without power is a world without politics. We don't live there. The importance of Flyvbjerg's book is that it acknowledges this fact."

The Australian called the book "the sharpest advance in our understanding of how power actually works since Machiavelli's The Prince was published in 1532."

Little Rock's Arkansas Democrat-Gazette wrote: "In Rationality and Power: Democracy in Practice, Bent Flyvbjerg employs a wide-ranging intellect, an enthusiastic and persuasive voice, academic rigor and great discipline to distill years of research into an outstanding and accessible 250-page civics lesson. It begs for a readership outside academic and professional circles ... Flyvbjerg punctuates his narrative with a wonderfully dry sense of the ironic and the absurd. He can be quietly devastating – even subtly prosecutorial – in exposing ... self-interest and hypocrisy ... Rationality and Power's value is undeniable as a handbook and forensic tool for anyone seeking a better understanding of and access to the democratic process."

Stewart Clegg commented that the book "exemplifies in many ways what is distinctive about Flyvbjerg’s work, as densely textured, ethnographically detailed, and theoretically acute".

== See also ==
- Power (social and political)
- Rule according to higher law
