= Hsu Szu-chien =

Taiwanese political scientist (born 1963)

- 徐斯儉
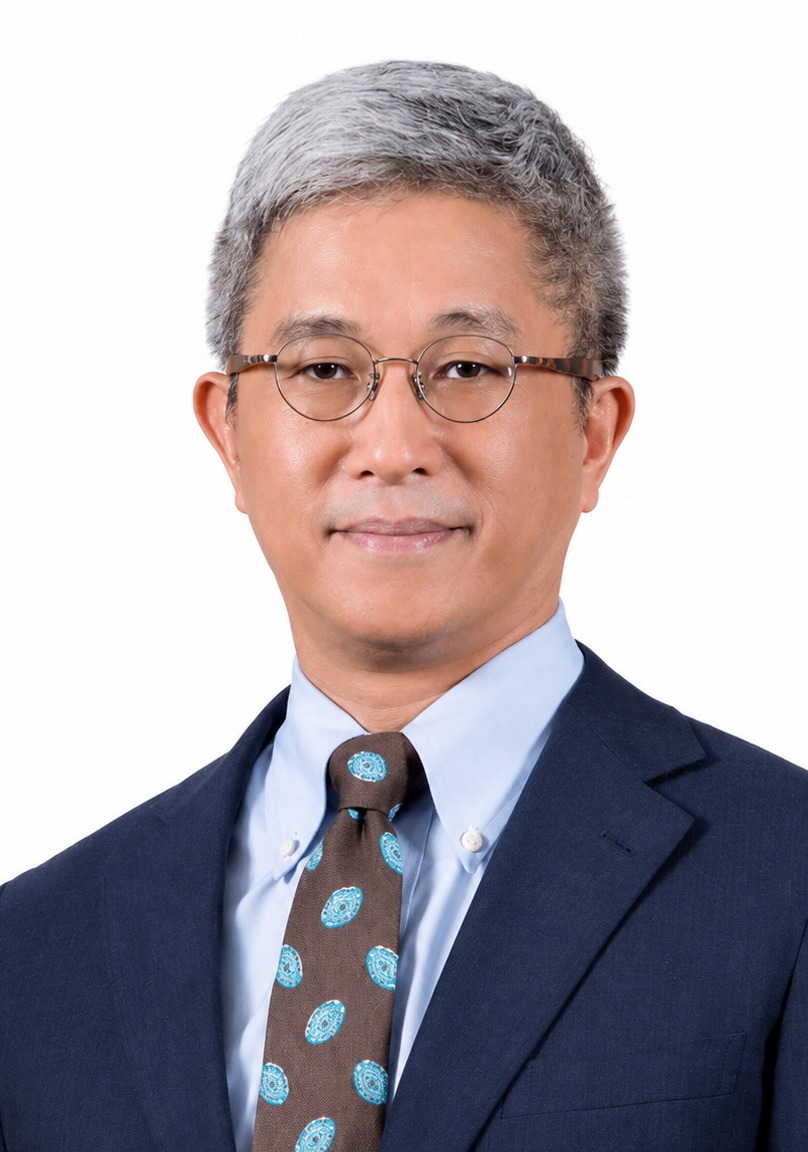
- Official portrait, 2019

Deputy Minister of National Defense
- Incumbent
- Assumed office December 1, 2025
- Minister: Wellington Koo
- Preceded by: Po Horng-Huei Alex

Deputy Minister of Foreign Affairs
- In office July 16, 2018 – July 23, 2020
- Preceded by: Wu Chih-chung
- Succeeded by: Tien Chung-kwang

Personal details
- Born: April 6, 1963 (age 63)
- Education: National Taiwan University (BA); Columbia University (MA, MPhil, PhD)

Hsu Szu-chien (Chinese: 徐斯儉; pinyin: Xú Sījiǎn; born April 6, 1963) is a Taiwanese political scientist who has served as the deputy minister of the Ministry of National Defense since 2025.

== Early life and education ==
Hsu was born in 1963 to a waishengren family. His brother, Hsu Szu-chin (徐斯勤), is a professor of political science.

Hsu graduated from National Taiwan University with a Bachelor of Arts in political science in 1985. He then earned his M.A., M.Phil., and Ph.D. in political science from Columbia University in 1990, 1995, and 1997, respectively. His doctoral dissertation, completed under sinologist Andrew Nathan, was titled, "The impact of rural industrialization on local state agents in post-Mao China, 1980-1994: A comparative study of four coastal rural townships".

== Career ==
After receiving his doctorate, Hsu was an associate professor of mainland Chinese studies at Chinese Culture University from 1997 to 1998. He then was a research fellow in international relations at National Chengchi University from 1998 to 2003. He became a political science research fellow at Academia Sinica and an executive member of the Center for Contemporary China at National Tsing Hua University, both in 2003.

Hsu was a joint assistant professor of sinology and China studies at National Tsing Hua University from 2004 to 2012, then an associate professor of sociology at the university from 2012 to 2016, during which time he served as the director of its Center for Contemporary China.

Taiwanese president Lai Ching-te appointed Hsu as the vice minister of the Ministry of National Defense on November 28, 2025. On December 1, 2026, Lai appointed him as deputy minister of the Ministry of National Defense.

== Personal life ==
Hsu is married to Yu Hsiao-min (喻小敏).
