= Taiwan–Tuvalu relations =

- Taiwan: Tuvalu

Diplomatic mission
- Embassy of Tuvalu in Taiwan: Embassy of the Republic of China (Taiwan) in Tuvalu

Envoy
- Ambassador: Ambassador

Taiwan–Tuvalu relations are the bilateral relations between Taiwan and Tuvalu. Taiwan maintains an embassy in Funafuti, and Tuvalu maintains an embassy in Taipei. As of 13 August 2025, Tuvalu is one of only 11 United Nations member states to have formal diplomatic relations with Taiwan.

== History ==
Taiwan has maintained diplomatic relations with Tuvalu since 1979. According to ambassador Bikenibeu Paeniu, Tuvalu's decision to recognize Taiwan was largely due to the fact that "the deeply Christian country was wary of the communists." On 14 March 2013, Tuvalu opened an embassy in Taipei, its fifth agency installed in a foreign country.

In June 2022, as a show of support for Taiwan, Tuvaluan foreign minister Simon Kofe withdrew from United Nations Ocean Conference opening after China blocked three Taiwanese members of the Tuvalu delegation from participating.

== Academic relations ==
In September 2022, The National Sun Yat-sen University (NSYSU) signed a memorandum of understanding with the Tuvaluan minister of public constructions Ampelosa Manoa Tehulu, witnessed by Tuvaluan prime minister Kausea Natano and Taiwanese foreign minister Joseph Wu. As part of the agreement, the Taiwan and Tuvalu Center on Marine Science and Engineering was established, and NSYSU became the first Taiwanese university to have a maritime research agreement with Tuvalu.

== See also ==
- Foreign relations of Taiwan
- Foreign relations of Tuvalu
