= Tuafafa Latasi =

Tuvaluan politician

The Honourable Tuafafa Latasi MP

Minister for Health and Social Welfare
- Incumbent
- Assumed office 27 February 2024
- Prime Minister: Feleti Teo
- Preceded by: Isaia Taape

Member of Parliament
- Incumbent
- Assumed office 26 January 2024
- Preceded by: Kausea Natano
- Constituency: Funafuti

Personal details
- Party: Independent

Tuafafa Latasi is a Tuvaluan politician.

== Civil service career ==
He was employed in the civil service of the Republic of Nauru from 9 January 1997 as the Chief Accountant. On 19 January 2001, he was appointed to the post of Secretary for Finance of Nauru.

== Political career ==
He was elected to the Parliament of Tuvalu in the 2024 Tuvaluan general election to represent Funafuti. He was appointed the Minister for Health and Social Welfare in the Teo Ministry.
