= Puakena Boreham =

Tuvaluan politician

The Honourable Dr Puakena Boreham MP
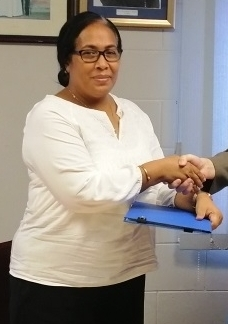
- Boreham in 2018

Minister of Works and Natural Resources
- In office August 2016 – 19 September 2019
- Prime Minister: Enele Sopoaga
- Preceded by: Elisala Pita
- Succeeded by: Sa'aga Talu Teafa

Member of Parliament
- In office 31 March 2015 – 26 January 2024
- Preceded by: Pelenike Isaia
- Succeeded by: Iakoba Italeli
- Constituency: Nui

Personal details
- Born: 18 December 1970 (age 55) Nui, Gilbert and Ellice Islands (present day Tuvalu)
- Party: Independent
- Spouse: Pasuna Tuaga
- Education: Fiji School of Medicine; Australian National University

Puakena Boreham (born 18 December 1970) is an anaesthetist who became a Tuvaluan politician, when she was elected to represent Nui in the 2015 Tuvaluan general election. She was not re-elected in the 2024 Tuvaluan general election.

== Medical career ==
Dr Boreham studied at the Fiji School of Medicine and graduated in 1998. She has worked for the Tuvaluan Ministry of Health at the Princess Margaret Hospital as an anaesthetist and as the Medical Superintendent. In 2014 she carried out post-graduate study at the Australian National University in global health diplomacy, global health and foreign policy.

== Parliamentary career ==
She was appointed as the Minister of Works and Natural Resources in August 2016; and served as the minister during the Sopoaga Ministry. She was re-elected in the 2019 general election.

Dr Boreham was the third woman to be elected to the Parliament of Tuvalu: following Naama Maheu Latasi (1989 to 1997); and Pelenike Isaia (2011 to 2015).

In July 2020, Dr. Boreham was appointed to the Constitutional Review Parliamentary Select Committee. The Final Report of the Constitutional Review Parliamentary Select Committee was published on 12 December 2022. The work of the committee resulted in the Constitution of Tuvalu Act 2023, which amended the Constitution of Tuvalu.
