= Charles Perrow =

American sociologist (1925–2019)

- Born: February 9, 1925; Tacoma, Washington, US
- Died: November 12, 2019 (aged 94); New Haven, Connecticut, US

Academic background
- Education: University of Washington; University of California, Berkeley
- Doctoral advisor: Philip Selznick
- Other advisor: Reinhard Bendix

Academic work
- Institutions: University of Michigan; University of Pittsburgh; University of Wisconsin–Madison; SUNY Stony Brook; Yale University
- Doctoral students: Miguel A. Centeno; Aldon Morris; Walter W. Powell; Mauro Guillén; Chen Ming-chi
- Notable works: Normal Accidents

Charles Bryce Perrow (February 9, 1925 – November 12, 2019), or Chick Perrow was an American sociologist and a leading figure of organizational sociology. He spent most of his career at SUNY Stony Brook and Yale University as a professor of sociology. He authored several books and many articles on organizations, including Normal Accidents, and was primarily concerned with the impact of large organizations on society.

== Academic appointments ==
After attending Black Mountain College in North Carolina and University of Washington, Perrow moved to and studied at the University of California, Berkeley, where he received his B.A. in 1953, M.A. in 1955 and PhD in 1960, all in sociology. His M.A. thesis was supervised by Reinhard Bendix and his PhD thesis was supervised by Philip Selznick.

Perrow became an instructor and later an assistant professor at the University of Michigan, where he stayed until 1963. He then moved to the University of Pittsburgh, where he stayed between 1963 and 1966, becoming an associate professor. He was an associate professor at the University of Wisconsin–Madison between 1966 and 1970 and a professor at SUNY Stony Brook from 1970 to 1981. In 1981, Perrow joined Yale University, where he became emeritus in 2000. In 2004, Perrow was a visiting professor at the Center for International Security and Cooperation at Stanford University, in the winter and spring quarters.

Perrow served as the Vice President of the Eastern Sociological Society. He was also a Fellow of the Center for Advanced Study in the Behavioral Sciences and the American Academy for the Advancement of Science. Perrow served as a Resident Scholar for the Russell Sage Foundation at the Shelly Cullom Davis Center for Historical Studies at Princeton University. Perrow was a visitor at the Institute for Advanced Study in Princeton, New Jersey. Perrow was a member of the Committee on Human Factors at the National Academy of Sciences of the Sociology Panel for the National Science Foundation.

== Notable works ==
Perhaps his most widely cited work is Complex Organizations: A Critical Essay (ISBN 0-07-554799-6), first published in 1972.

Perrow is also the author of the book Normal Accidents: Living With High Risk Technologies (ISBN 0-691-00412-9) which explains his theory of normal accidents; catastrophic accidents that are inevitable in tightly coupled and complex systems. His theory predicts that failures will occur in multiple and unforeseen ways that are virtually impossible to predict.

== Selected publications ==
=== Books ===
- Perrow, Charles (2011, New Edition) (2007). The Next Catastrophe: Reducing Our Vulnerabilities to Natural, Industrial, and Terrorist Disasters. Princeton, NJ: Princeton University Press.
- Perrow, Charles (2002). Organizing America: wealth, power, and the origins of corporate capitalism. Princeton, N.J: Princeton University Press. ISBN 978-0-691-08954-6.
- Perrow, Charles; Guillén, Mauro F. (1990). The AIDS disaster: the failure of organizations in New York and the nation. New Haven: Yale University Press. ISBN 978-0-300-04879-7.
- Perrow, Charles (1984). Normal Accidents: Living With High Risk Technologies. (Revised edition, 1999). Princeton, NJ: Princeton University Press.
- Perrow, Charles (1972). Complex Organizations: A Critical Essay. (Third edition, 1986). McGraw-Hill Publishers.
- Perrow, Charles (1972). The Radical Attack on Business. Harcourt Brace Jovanovich.
- Perrow, Charles (1970). Organizational analysis: a sociological view. Behavioral science in industry. London: Tavistock Publications. ISBN 978-0-422-73480-6.

=== Chapters ===
- Charles Perrow (2010). “Organizations and Global Warming,” Constance Lever-Tracy, ed., Routledge Handbook of Climate Change and Society. 2010, New York City: Routledge. 59–77
- Charles Perrow (2010). The Meltdown Was Not an Accident, in Michael Lounsbury, Paul M. Hirsch (ed.) Markets on Trial: The Economic Sociology of the U.S. Financial Crisis: Part A (Research in the Sociology of Organizations, Volume 30), Emerald Group Publishing Limited, pp. 309–330

=== Articles and Papers ===
- Perrow, Charles (2013). Nuclear Denial: From Hiroshima to Fukushima. Bulletin of the Atomic Scientists, Volume 69 Issue 5.
- Perrow, Charles (2012). Getting to Catastrophe: Concentrations, Complexity and Coupling. The Montréal Review.
- Perrow, Charles (2011). Fukushima and the Inevitability of Accidents. Bulletin of the Atomic Scientists.
- Perrow, Charles (2011). Technology Can Nudge Climate Change Politics. Bloomberg News.
- Perrow, Charles (2011). Fukushima, risk, and probability: Expect the unexpected. Bulletin of the Atomic Scientists.
- Perrow, Charles (2010). Giddens and the Developing Nations Examine Global Warming. Review Essay, Contemporary Sociology, 2010, v 39, no 4, 411–416.
- Perrow, Charles (2009). "Modeling firms in the global economy." Theory and Society, 2009, v 38:3, May, 217–243.
- Perrow, Charles (2008). Software Failures, Security, and Cyberattacks. Paper.
- Perrow, Charles (2008). "Disasters Evermore? Reducing our Vulnerabilities to Natural, Industrial, and Terrorist Disasters," Social Research 75:3 Fall, 2008, 1–20.
- Perrow, Charles (2008). "Complexity, Catastrophe, and Modularity," Sociological Inquiry 78:2, May 2008 162–73
- Perrow, Charles (2008). "Conservative Radicalism," Organization 15:6 2008 915–921

== See also ==
- High reliability organization
- Megaprojects and Risk
- Brittle Power
