= Megaproject =

Extremely large-scale construction and investment project

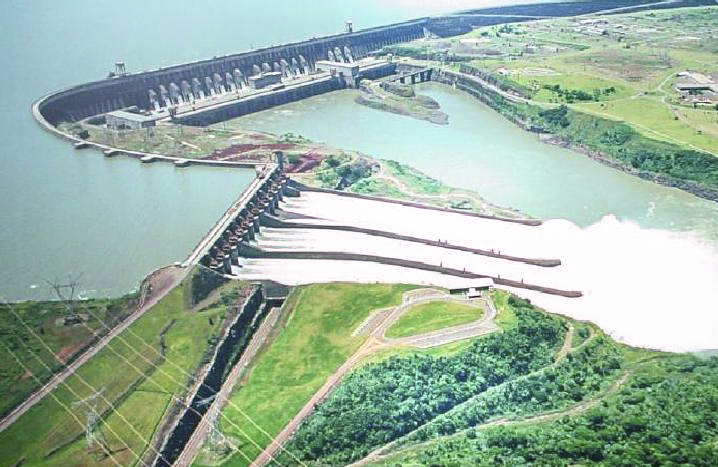
Itaipu Dam in South America, an example of a 20th-century megaproject

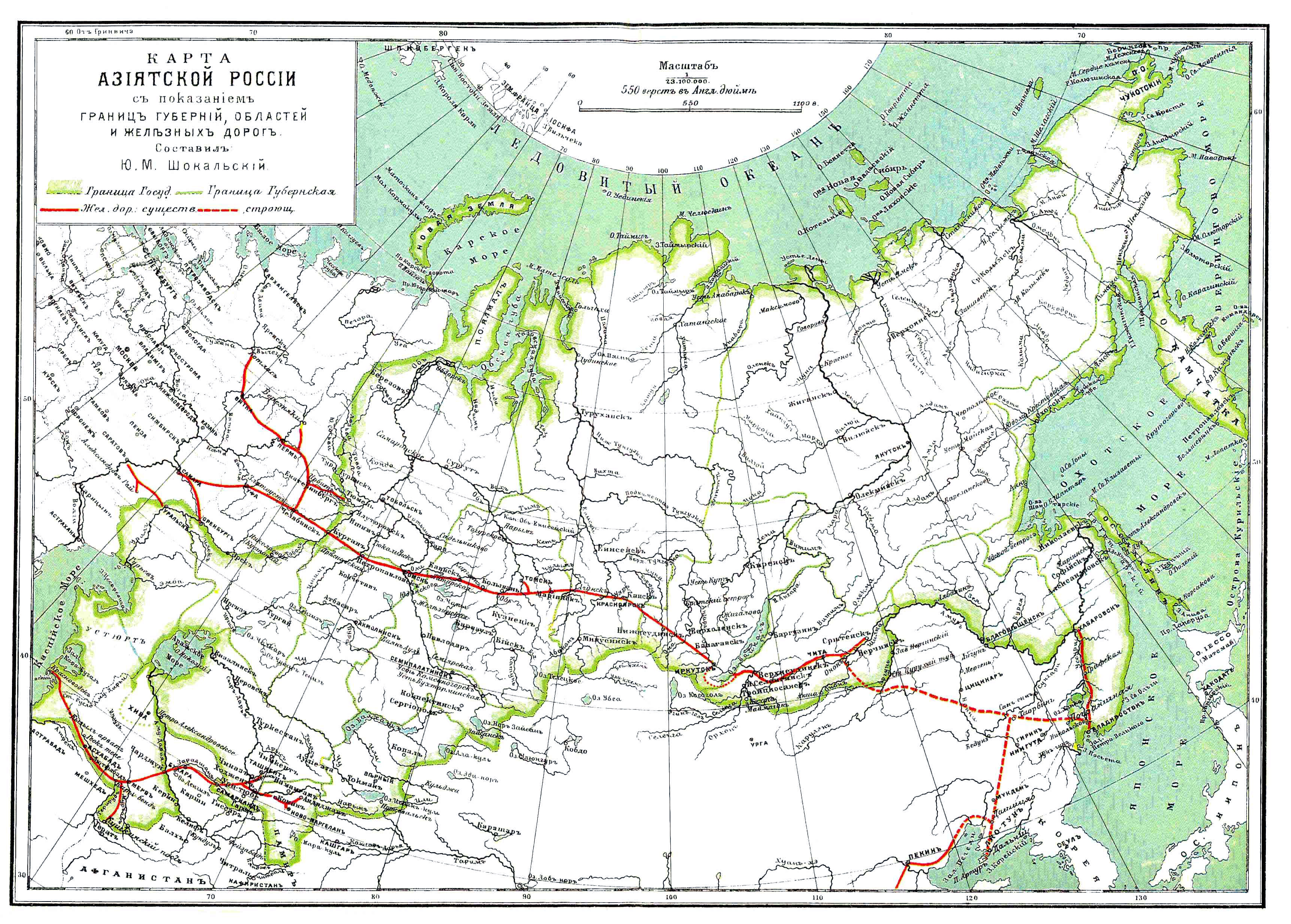
The Trans-Siberian Railway and other railways in the Asiatic part of the Russian Empire were important 19th-century megaprojects.

A megaproject is an extremely large-scale investment project. They can be defined as "temporary endeavours (i.e. projects) characterised by: large investment commitment, vast complexity (especially in organisational terms), and long-lasting impact on the economy, the environment, and society". Megaprojects may refer to construction projects but also decommissioning projects with multi-billion budgets, and a high level of innovation and complexity, affected by a number of techno-socio-economic and organizational challenges.

== Definition and examples ==
According to Alan Altshuler in 2003 megaprojects could be defined as "initiatives that are physical, very expensive, and public". In 2020 the EU defined it as an extremely large-scale investment project. A more general definition is "Megaprojects are temporary endeavours (i.e. projects) characterised by: large investment commitment, vast complexity (especially in organisational terms), and long-lasting impact on the economy, the environment, and society". Typical hallmarks of megaprojects include: large project size, uniqueness, and complexity.

Megaprojects may refer to construction projects and also decommissioning projects with multi-billion budgets, and a high level of innovation and complexity, affected by a number of techno-socio-economic and organizational challenges.

Megaprojects may include special economic zones, public buildings, power plants, dams, airports, hospitals, seaports, bridges, highways, tunnels, railways, wastewater projects, oil and natural gas extraction projects, aerospace projects, weapons systems, information technology systems, large-scale sporting events and, mixed use waterfront redevelopments; however, the most common megaprojects are in the categories of hydroelectric facilities, nuclear power plants, and large public transportation projects.

Megaprojects do not have to be physical and can also include large-scale high-cost initiatives in scientific research and infrastructure, such as the Human Genome Project.

== Specialized government agencies ==
In the United States, the OFCCP Mega Construction Project (Megaproject) Program involves projects valued at over $35 million. In 2024, the Federal Highway Administration wrote that prior to the enactment of SAFETEA-LU in August 2005, projects with over $1 billion in construction costs were designated as "Mega Projects"; following the Act, the term "Mega Project" has been eliminated and replaced with the term "Major Project."

In the UK, large government projects are handled by the Infrastructure and Projects Authority (known prior to 2025 as the Major Projects Authority).

In Canada, the Major Projects Office's role focuses on projects designated by the government as "national interest projects".

== Rationale ==
The logic on which many of the typical megaprojects are built is the promise of collective benefits; for example electricity for everybody (who can pay), road access (for those that have cars), etc. They may also serve as a means to open frontiers. Megaprojects attract significant public attention because of substantial impacts on communities, environment, and budgets, and the high costs involved.

As of 2008 new types of megaprojects had been identified that no longer follow the old models of being singular and monolithic in their purposes, but have become quite flexible and diverse, such as waterfront redevelopment schemes that seem to offer something to everybody. However, just like the old megaprojects, these also foreclose "upon a wide variety of social practices, reproducing rather than resolving urban inequality and disenfranchisement". Because of their plethora of land uses "these mega-projects inhibit the growth of oppositional and contestational practices". The collective benefits that are often the underlying logic of a mega-project, are here reduced to an individualized form of public benefit.

== Downsides ==
According to the European Cooperation in Science and Technology (COST), megaprojects are characterized both by "extreme complexity (both in technical and human terms) and by a long record of poor delivery".

Megaprojects typical features such as large project size, uniqueness, and complexity favour corruption, which is why megaprojects are easily affected by it. For example, large and complex projects make it easier to hide bribes and inflated claims than small, transparent projects. Also, budget costs of unique projects are difficult to compare and easier to inflate. Corruption is very detrimental, leading to higher cost and lower benefit.

Megaprojects have been criticised for their top-down planning processes and their ill effects on certain communities. Large scale projects often advantage one group of people while disadvantaging another, for instance, the Three Gorges Dam in China, the largest hydroelectric project in the world, required the displacement of 1.2 million farmers. In the 1970s, the highway revolts in some Western nations saw urban activists opposing government plans to demolish buildings for freeway route construction, on the basis that such demolitions would unfairly disadvantage the urban working class and benefit commuters. Anti-nuclear protests against proposed nuclear power plants in the United States and Germany prevented developments due to environmental and social concerns.

== Economics ==
Proponents of infrastructure-based development advocate for funding large-scale projects to create long-term economic benefits. Investing in megaprojects in order to stimulate the general economy has been a popular policy measure since the economic crisis of the 1930s.

Recent examples are the 2008–2009 Chinese economic stimulus program, the 2008 European Union stimulus plan, the American Recovery and Reinvestment Act of 2009.

Megaprojects often raise capital based on expected returns, though projects often go over budget and over time, and market conditions like commodity prices can change. Concern at cost overruns is often expressed by critics of megaprojects during the planning phase. If the megaproject is delivered in a country with relevant corruption the likelihood and magnitude of having overbudgets increases.

One of the most challenging aspects of megaprojects is obtaining sufficient funding. Creative and politically adept political leadership is required to secure resources as well as generate public support, mollify critics, and manage conflict through many years of planning, authorization and implementation. Other challenges faced by those planning megaprojects include laws and regulations that empower community groups, contested information and methodologies, high levels of uncertainty, avoiding impacts on neighborhoods and the environment, and attempting to solve a wicked problem.

== See also ==
- List of megaprojects
- List of transport megaprojects
- Macro-engineering
- Megastructure
- Reference class forecasting
- Optimism bias
- Gigantomania
- Megaprojects and Risk
- When Technology Fails
