= Tien Chung-kwang =

Taiwanese politician and former Minister of Foreign Affairs

- 田中光
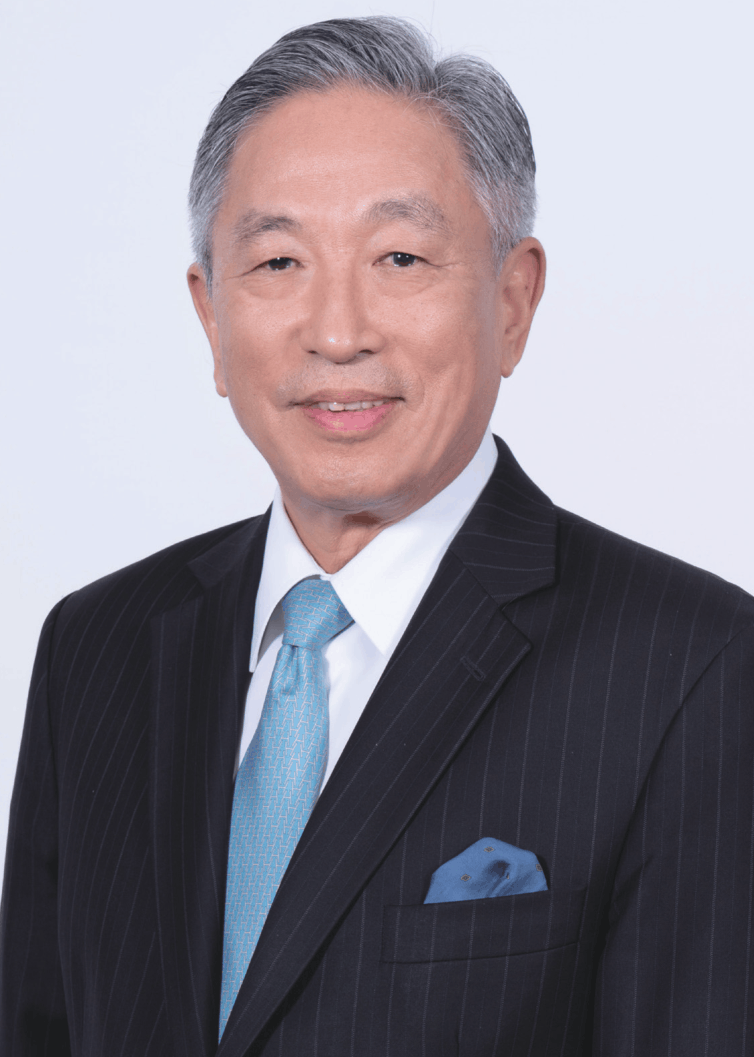
- Official portrait, 2025

Deputy Minister of Foreign Affairs
- In office 24 July 2020 – February 19, 2025 Serving with Tseng Hou-jen
- Minister: Joseph Wu
- Vice: Miguel Tsao
- Preceded by: Hsu Szu-chien
- Succeeded by: Chen Ming-chi

ROC Representative to India
- In office 2013–2020

ROC Ambassador to Tuvalu
- In office 2008–2010

Personal details
- Education: Fu Jen Catholic University (BA); St. Thomas University (MBA)

Tien Chung-kwang (Chinese: 田中光; pinyin: Tián Zhōngguāng) is a Taiwanese politician who served as Deputy Minister of Foreign Affairs from 2020 to 2025.

== Education ==
Tien graduated with his bachelor's degree in English literature from Fu Jen Catholic University and earned a Master of Business Administration (M.B.A.) at St. Thomas University in the United States.
