= Megaprojects and Risk =

2003 book by Bent Flyvbjerg, Nils Bruzelius and Werner Rothengatter

Megaprojects and Risk: An Anatomy of Ambition
- Author: Bent Flyvbjerg; Nils Bruzelius; Werner Rothengatter
- Language: English
- Subject: Economics, infrastructure
- Genre: Non-fiction
- Publisher: Cambridge University Press
- Publication date: 2003
- Publication place: United States
- Media type: Print, e-book
- ISBN: 0-521-80420-5
- OCLC: 50271600

Megaprojects and Risk: An Anatomy of Ambition is a 2003 book by Bent Flyvbjerg, Nils Bruzelius, and Werner Rothengatter, published by Cambridge University Press about megaprojects in the form of vast construction schemes around the world. They demonstrate that participants in the process are incentivized to underestimate costs, undervalue environmental impact, and overvalue revenue and economic development effects.

== Overview ==
According to the authors, the reason for such poor performances is that many of the participants in the process have incentives to underestimate costs, overestimate revenues, undervalue environmental impact, and overvalue economic development effects. The authors argue that central problems are lack of accountability and inappropriate risk sharing, which can be improved by reforming the institutional arrangements of decision making and by instituting accountability at the project development and evaluation stages.

== Reception ==
According to chief economist and director of transportation policy at Infrastructure Management Group, Inc., Porter K. Wheeler, "this book makes an important contribution to understanding the infrastructure development process worldwide, with focus on megaprojects." The New Scientist wrote upon publication, "Love them or loathe them, megaprojects capture the imagination. [This] damning analysis concentrates on a series of financial nightmares that should bring even the most casual reader out in a sweat."

The Times of London gave Megaprojects and Risk a cover story and wrote, "Life is too short to read every tome penned by Scandinavian and German social scientists. But Megaprojects and Risk, written by Bent Flyvbjerg, Nils Bruzelius and Werner Rothengatter, is a cracker. In lurid and startling detail it examines dozens of vast construction schemes around the world."

The International Journal of Urban and Regional Research wrote, "a timely intervention ... Flyvbjerg et al. have presented us with something close to a manifesto that should really be in the hands of every planning minister, regional and city planner, journalist and activist involved in mega-project development ... by the end I was wishing that more social scientists had such a lightness of touch and precise use of illustration. ... highly insightful."

The Geographical Journal wrote, "this is the first [book] of its kind. It is concise and clear ... The subject matter is extremely interesting, timely and relevant. It sits within the tradition of ‘Victims of Groupthink’ and ‘Great Planning Disasters’ and attempts to find practical solutions. It is also highly suggestive of wider application beyond its immediate concerns."

The Financial Express of India found the book, "a perfect complement to the richly textured arguments closer to home of Arundhati Roy in her damning indictment of the Narmada Dam and the Sardar Sarovar Project in The Greater Common Good ... The authors [of Megaprojects and Risk] provide a peep-show into social psychology [with] a wealth of empirical evidence ... Do read this book."

== See also ==
- List of cancelled nuclear plants in the United States
- When Technology Fails
- Normal Accidents: Living with High-Risk Technologies
- Northeast blackout of 2003
- Brittle Power: Energy Strategy for National Security
- Small Is Beautiful
- Small Is Profitable
