= Sa'aga Talu Teafa =

Tuvaluan politician

The Honourable Sa'aga Talu Teafa MP

Minister for Natural Resources Development
- Incumbent
- Assumed office 27 February 2024
- Prime Minister: Feleti Teo
- Preceded by: Puakena Boreham

Minister for Local Government & Agriculture
- In office June 2022 – 27 February 2024
- Prime Minister: Kausea Natano
- Preceded by: Katepu Laoi

Member of Parliament
- Incumbent
- Assumed office 6 June 2022
- Constituency: Niutao

Personal details
- Party: Independent

Sa'aga Talu Teafa is a Tuvaluan politician who had previously served as a civil servant. Teafa formerly served as the Ministry of Public Utilities' Permanent Secretary.

== Chief Ombudsman ==
In October 2014, he was selected for a five-year term as the nation's first chief Ombudsman.

In 2019, he criticized the government of New Zealand for discriminatory immigration requirements which prohibit disabled people from emigrating to New Zealand.

== Political career ==
Teafa was elected a member of parliament to represent Niutao on 6 June 2022 following the death of Katepu Laoi in April 2022. In June 2022, Teafa was appointed as Minister for Home Affairs & Agriculture in the Natano Ministry.

He was re-elected as a member of parliament in the 2024 Tuvaluan general election. He was also appointed the Minister for Natural Resources Development in the Teo Ministry.
