= Timi Melei =

Tuvaluan politician

The Honourable Timi Melei MP

Minister for Education, Youth & Sports
- In office 19 September 2019 – 27 February 2024
- Prime Minister: Kausea Natano
- Preceded by: Fauoa Maani

Member of Parliament
- Incumbent
- Assumed office 9 September 2019
- Preceded by: Maatia Toafa
- Constituency: Nanumea

Personal details
- Party: Independent
- Education: Victoria University of Wellington

Timi Melei is a Tuvaluan politician.

Melei worked as an officer of the Tuvalu Police Force. He did not attend secondary school as a teenager, but returned at age eighteen to learn English. He later studied at Victoria University of Wellington in New Zealand, graduating in 2016 with a Masters in Criminology.

He was elected to the Parliament of Tuvalu at the 2019 Tuvaluan general election, and appointed Minister for Education, Youth & Sports in the cabinet of Kausea Natano.

During his term as minister the Ministry of Education, Youth and Sports, launched the Tuvalu Learning Project (TuLEP) to strengthen the quality of education and service delivery for pre-school children. This five-year project, which commenced in 2020, was funded by a grant of US$14 million from the World Bank, with the project including: training of teachers; resourcing of pre-school centers with learning materials, age-appropriate readers and playgroup kits. TuLEP also includes funding for internet connectivity in all outer island schools to facilitate online learning and communications.

He was appointed as a Member of Council of the University of the South Pacific.

He was re-elected in the 2024 Tuvaluan general election.

== Published works ==
- John Pratt and Timi Melei, Chapter 35. “One of the Smallest Prison Populations in the World under Threat” of The Palgrave Handbook of Criminology and the Global South (20 January 2018) Kerry Carrington (Editor), Russell Hogg (Editor), John Scott (Editor), Palgrave MacMillan, ISBN 978-3-319-65022-7
