= Niutao =

Reef island and one of nine districts of Tuvalu

- Reef Island
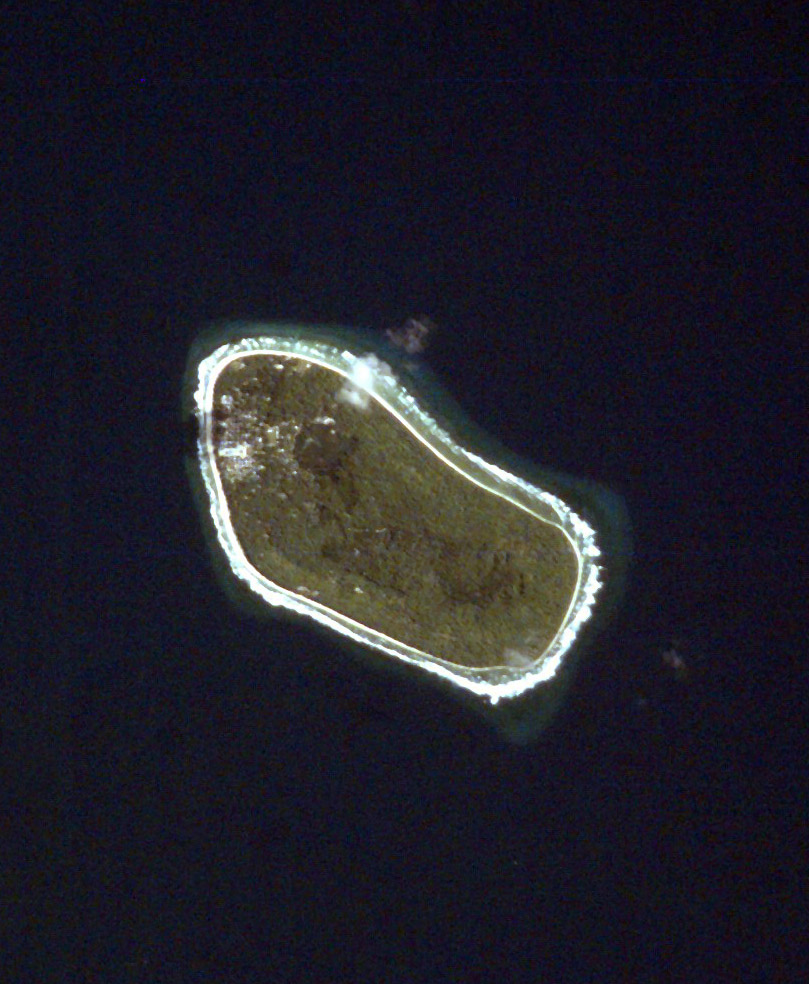
- Satellite image of Niutao

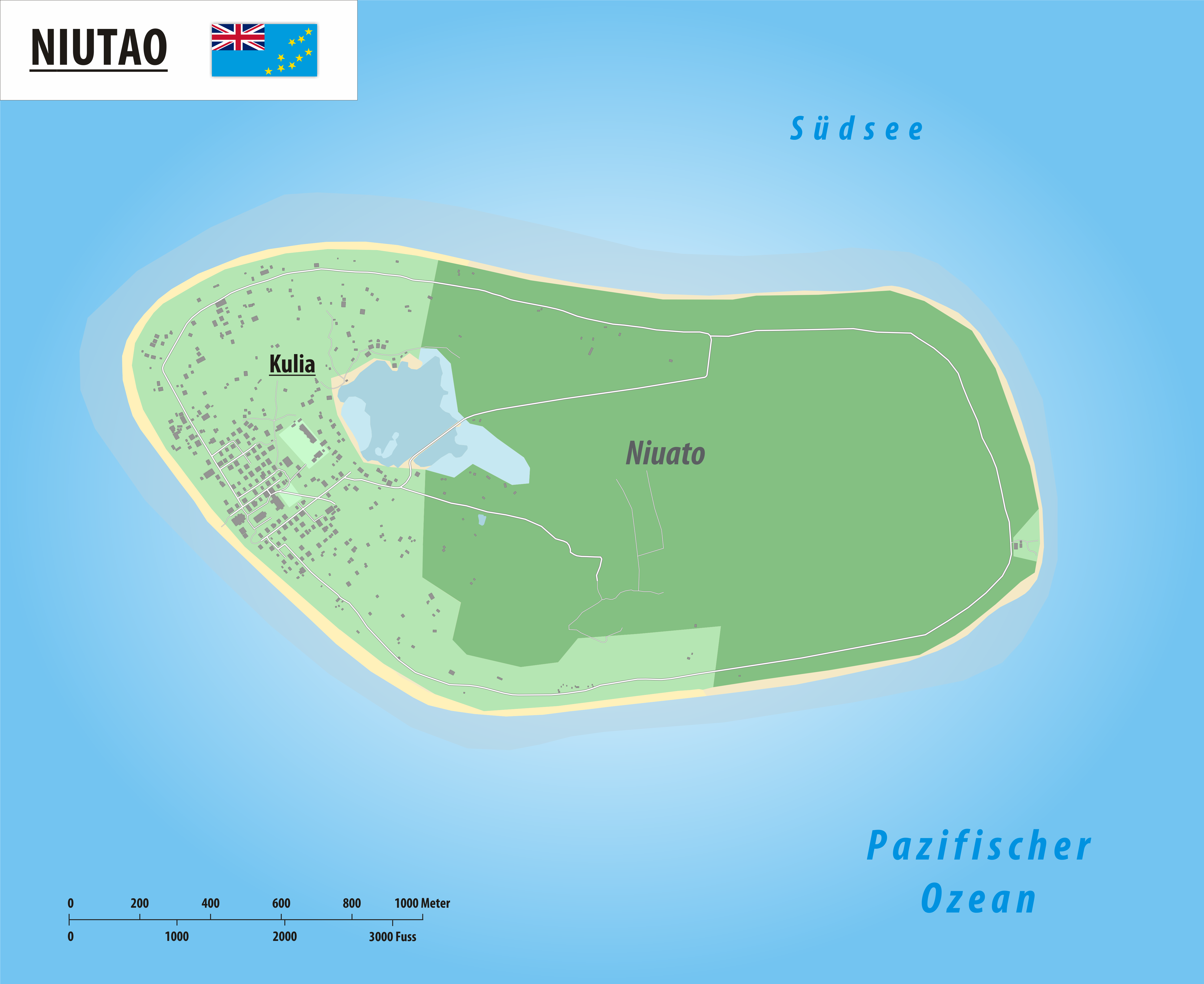
- Map of the island

- Location in Tuvalu
- Coordinates: 06°06′30″S 177°20′29″E
- Country: Tuvalu

Area
  - Total: 2.53 km^{2} (0.98 sq mi)

Population (2022)
  - Total: 550
  - Density: 220/km^{2} (560/sq mi)
- ISO 3166 code: TV-NIT

Niutao is a reef island in the northern part of Tuvalu. It is one of the nine districts (islands) of Tuvalu. It is also one of the three districts that consist of only one island — not counting the three islets inside the closed lagoon. Niutao has a population of 550 (2022 census).

== Geography ==
There are two lakes (ponds or lagoons), which are brackish to saline. The larger has three islands and a dam. There are three wells in which fresher water sits in a lens above the salt water that leaches in through the coral. Older maps show the only village as Tuapa (with the neighbourhood of Angafoulua). The main village is Kulia; another village is Teava. There is a maneapa (community hall), Uepele Primary School, a church named Tineifale of the Church of Tuvalu, a post office, and three wells. A gravel road rings the island to connect the graveyard, half mile (800 m) counter clockwise from the village, and clockwise a quarter of a mile (400 m) to the hospital. The island is somewhat a horizontal oval which has a length of about one mile (1.6 km). Vegetation is abundant but of very limited variety. Main food staples are pulaka (Cyrtosperma merkusii) or swamp taro that is grown in the pits; breadfruit, coconut and pandanus is also cultivated. A fringing reef surrounds the whole island, which makes local fishing and transport into and out of the island difficult.

In March 2015 Niutao suffered damage to houses, crops and infrastructure as the result of storm surges caused by Cyclone Pam.

== History ==
=== Prehistory ===
Niutaoans believe that their ancestors came from Samoa in the 12th or 13th century. Niutaon mythology tells the story of the people who first inhabited Niutao: "The first inhabitants of Niutao were half spirit and half human beings who lived at Mulitefao. Their leader was Kulu who took the form of a woman. The first human settlers came from Samoa in a canoe captained by a man called Mataika. He settled at Tamana on the eastern side of the island, where winds swept the spray of the surf over the reef."

In the 15th century warriors from Tonga were defeated in a battle on the reef of Niutao at a place known as Tāga A Kaupapa. Tongan warriors also invaded Niutao later in the 15th century and again were repelled. A third invasion of Tongan warriors occurred in the late 16th century; with a fourth following when the Tongans were defeated at a place called Tekamaitoga.

During the 17th century warriors invaded from the islands of Kiribati on two occasions. These battles were fought on the reef; the I-Kiribati stood at Tuteatua and the Niutaoan warriors stood at Agaia; the sacred place named Teititapalua identifies the site of these battles. In the late 17th century fighting occurred in Niutao between competing leaders, with the followers of the defeated leaders being forced off Niutao and were allowed to settle on Nanumea.

Niutao is part of a distinct linguistic area of Tuvalu, that includes the islands of Nanumea and Nanumaga as well.

=== European contact and Christianization ===
There has been some debate as to the first European (Palagi) to visit Niutao, Keith S. Chambers and Doug Munro (1980) solved what Europeans described as The 'Mystery' of Gran Cocal and identified Spanish naval officer Francisco Mourelle de la Rúa as sailing past Niutao on 5 May 1781. Laumua Kofe (1983) accepted Chambers and Munro's conclusions, with Kofe describing Mourelle's ship La Princesa, as waiting beyond the reef, with Nuitaoans coming out in canoes, bringing some coconuts with them. La Princesa was short of supplies but Mourelle was forced to sail on — naming Niutao, El Gran Cocal ('The Great Coconut Plantation').

The next European recorded as sighting Niutao was Obed Starbuck, a whaling captain, who visited Niutao on the Loper in 1825, naming it 'Loper Island'. Presumably this was on 19 November and or 20 November 1825.

Charlie Douglas was an early trader on Niutao in the 1850s. Christianization of Niutao began in 1861, with the first introduction by the traders Mr Tom and Mr Jack with the help of Mr Ah Fong and Mr Tong. Mose, from Vaitupu, helped persuade the chiefs and people of Niutao to accept Christianity. The first preachers were a Samoan missionary and a Niuean missionary. Tapumanaia Kitiona was the Samoan missionary on Niutao who arrived in 1865 after graduating from Malua Theological College in Samoa. The Reverend Archibald Wright Murray, of the London Missionary Society, visited in 1866. Murray reported that a blackbirder (a slave ship seeking to kidnap workers to mine the guano deposits on the Chincha Islands in Peru) had called but no islanders were taken by the blackbirders because of the actions of McKenzie, the resident trader. In 1870, Tapu of Samoa and Sione of Niue, two teachers from the Samoa Fono Tele (General Assembly of Samoan Churches) were delivered to Niutao by the Reverend Samuel James Whitmee.

Navy ships known to have visited Niutao in the 19th century are: HMS Basilisk, Captain John Moresby (July 1872); HMS Emerald, Captain William Maxwell (1881); HMS Royalist, Captain Edward Davis (1892); and HMS Curacoa, Captain Herbert Gibson (1892). Captain Davis of the Royalist, reported Niutao as exporting about 50 tons of copra each year — in a good season.

Palagi copra traders known to have been resident on Niutao are: Charlie Douglas (1850s); Mr Tom, Mr Jack, Mr Ah Fong and Mr Tong (c. 1861); Mr McKenzie (c. 1866); George Winchcombe (c. 1876-1880); George Westbrook (1880s); Jack O'Brien (c. 1880s); Jack Buckland (c. 1892); and Fred Whibley (May/June 1898 to c. 1911).

=== The Cruise of the Janet Nichol ===
The Janet Nicoll was a trading steamer owned by Henderson and Macfarlane of Auckland, New Zealand, which operated between Sydney, Auckland and into the central Pacific. Robert Louis Stevenson was in Sydney, Australia in April 1890, looking for a ship to travel into the central Pacific; he and his wife Fanny Vandegrift Stevenson, and her son Lloyd Osbourne sailed on the Janet Nicoll. From 29 May to 2 June 1890 the Janet Nicoll anchored off Niutao to take on copra. An account of the voyage was written by Fanny Vandegrift Stevenson and published under the title The Cruise of the Janet Nichol. A passenger on the ship was Jack Buckland, who later returned to Niutao to be the resident copra trader.

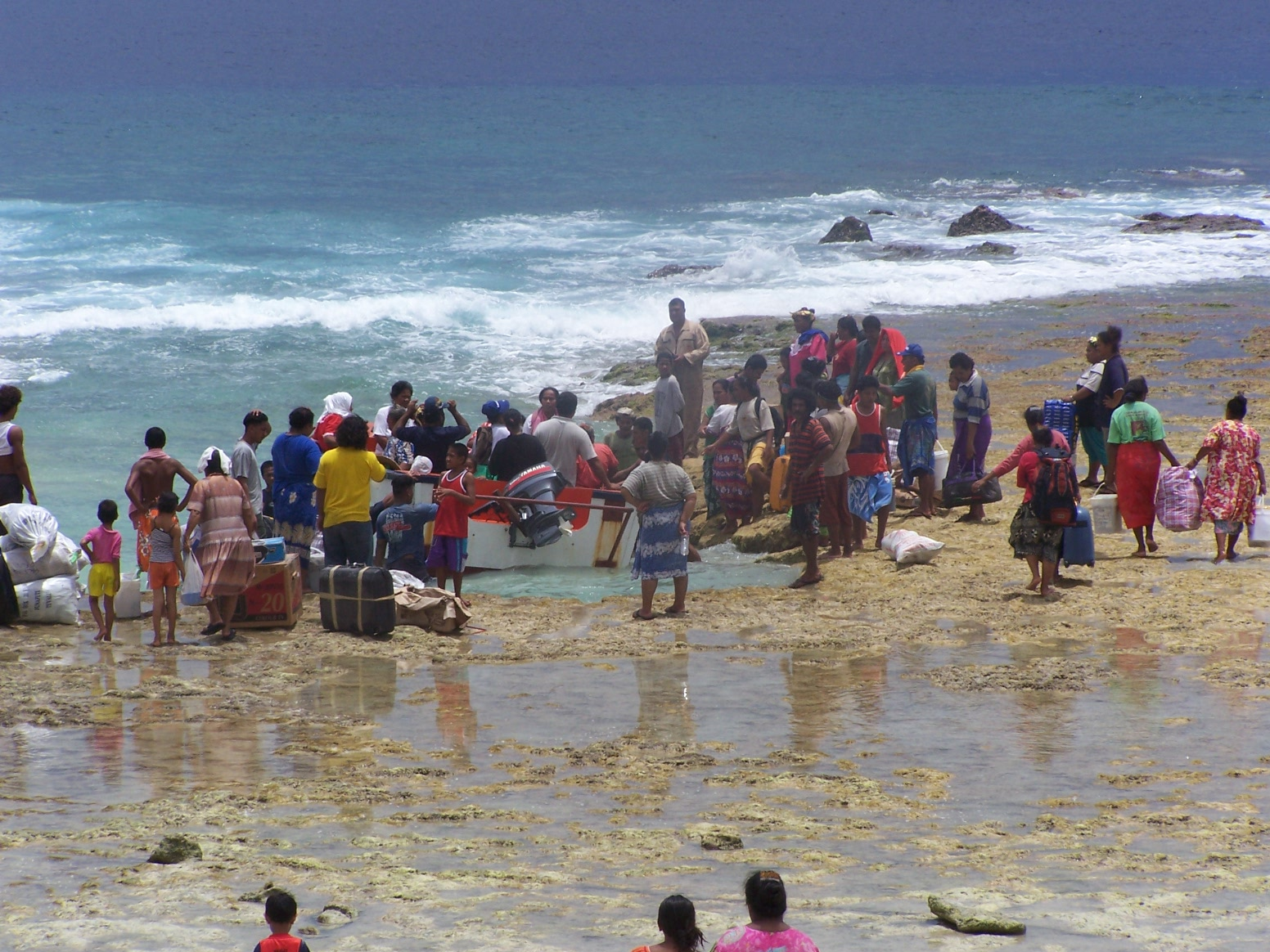
Landing cargo on the reef at Niutao (2006)

=== 20th century ===
The Niutaons financed the building of a church which was designed and built by Mr Foster Wesley and his assistant Lifuka Falakai from Vaiputo, with skilled Niutaons also working on the church. Building began in April 1915 and was completed in about September 1919. The service of dedication was led by Pastor Panapa of Samoa and the church was named Tineifale. Ernest Tanumafili Allen, son of Captain Ernest Frederick Hughes Allen of the Samoa Shipping Trading Co Ltd, recalled in his memoir that his firm was involved in the building of the church. Part payment of $4,000 of the costs of the church was being delivered to the ship Dawn off Niutao. The money, mostly gold sovereigns, was in a small box, the lid secured by sinnet string; as the box was being passed from the canoe to the ship it was turned upside down and the coins fell into the sea. Immediately a further collection was carried out, which yielded $3,000.

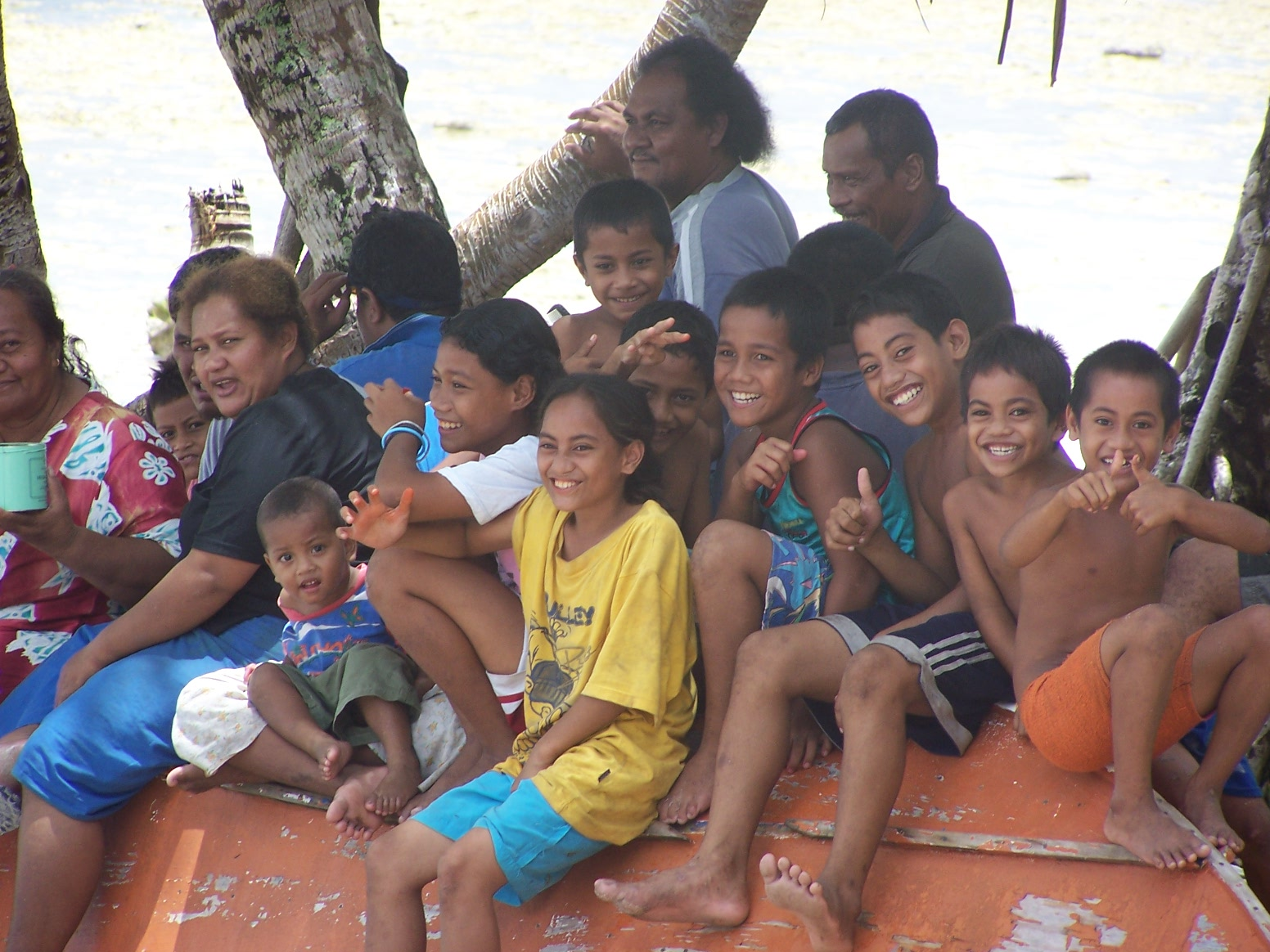
Children on Niutao

Niutao Post Office opened around 1918.

In 1919 a new Fale Kaupule (community hall) was built, which was named Fetu Afiafi. The anointing slab or stone of the Chiefs of Malaefono was moved into the Fale Kaupule; this stone was the symbol of authority, dignity, honour and peace. The paletua (seat) of the Chief Kaupule or Fogauli was made out of pukavai (Pisonia grandis) timber by Fred Whibley.

The construction of a primary school began in early 1951 and was opened on 21 July 1953. The school was named “Whibley Memorial School” by the Paramount Chiefs as Fred Whibley (trader resident on Niutao from 1898 to circa 1911) had encouraged education. The first teacher was Pulekai Alofa Sogivalu, with a class of 40 pupils.

In 1959 the Fale Kaupule (community hall) was reconstructed under the supervision of Fiatau Penitala Teo and the builder Pese Kaitu, and the building was renamed Fetu Afiafi 2.

In 1961 Gerd Koch, a German anthropologist, recorded songs and filmed life on Niutao. Koch returned to Niutao in 1996, where he met islanders who were children when he visited in 1961.

In 1964 the Island Councils of Tuvalu were restructured so as to consist of a President, Vice-President and three councillors elected by the people of each island. In 1979 the central government reformed the Council of Chiefs of each island. From the late 18th century the two Paramount Chiefs of Niutao were leaders of the districts of Teitieva and Malaefono. Following the changes to the role of the Council of Chiefs, the Paramount Chiefs of the districts of Teitieva and Malaefono unanimously agreed that: “There should be one Paramount Chief elected from the two domains. Each domain should then elect two other members. These five members would form the new Council of Chiefs.” The Council of Chiefs works with the Falekaupule on the management of communal activities. The Council of Chiefs maintains its right, in accordance with traditions and customs, to exercise power in matters affecting the social life of the community.

In 2016 Mauatu Teponga was elected chief.

In 2024 new boat harbour facilities were constructed on the reef for workboats to use. The facilities include a sea access channel, approach jetty, wharf, boat ramp and passenger terminal. The project includes the construction of buildings for cargo near the jetty to assist in the safe movement of passengers and cargo from the land to the ship.

== Demographics ==
Newton (1967) estimated that the early 19th century population of Niutao was about 450 people, with these estimates derived from reports of European visitors to Niutao:

Rev. Archibald Wright Murray 1866	Rev. Samuel James Whitmee 1870	Captain John Moresby 1872	Rev. Gill 1872
700	360	417	417
Probable overestimate	100 on other islands		
Missionary visitor	Missionary visitor	HMS Basilisk	Missionary visitor

In 1949, people from overpopulated Niutao settled on Niulakita.

Official sources of the 2002 census of population, listed the village of Kulia (pop. 224) and the village of Teava (pop. 439). The 2012 census, listed the village of Kulia (pop. 200) and the village of Teava (pop. 406).

Central Statistics Department (CSD) of Tuvalu recorded census results:

1979 Census	1985 Census	1991 Census	2002 Census	2012 Census	2017 Census
866	904	749	854	606	582

The Census Monograph on Migration, Urbanization and Youth provides an analysis of the 2012 census and reported: Niutao and other northern islands had relatively high net migration losses, with most being internal migrants to Funafuti.

== Politics ==
Feleti Teo and Sa'aga Talu Teafa were elected in the 2024 general election.

Niutao constituency results
Party	Candidate	Votes	%
Nonpartisan	Feleti Teo	581	46.40
Nonpartisan	Sa'aga Talu Teafa	499	39.85
Nonpartisan	Samuelu Teo	172	13.74

== Notable people ==
- Sir Fiatau Penitala Teo GCMG ISO MBE (1911–1986), Appointed Chief in the House of Chiefs of Niutao in 1945; appointed as the first Governor General of Tuvalu on independence from Great Britain on 1 October 1978; reappointed as a Chief on 29 June 1997.
- Sir Tomu Sione, GCMG OBE (1941– 2016) former Governor General of Tuvalu and subsequently Speaker of the Parliament of Tuvalu; he represented the constituency in the parliament until the 2010 Tuvaluan general election.
- Tavau Teii, Deputy Prime Minister and Minister of Natural Resources in the Government of Tuvalu, he represented the constituency in the parliament until the 2010 Tuvaluan general election.

== Publications ==
- Christensen, Dieter, Old Musical Styles in the Ellice Islands, Western Polynesia, Ethnomusicology, 8:1 (1964), 34–40
- Christensen, Dieter and Gerd Koch, Die Musik der Ellice-Inseln, Berlin: Museum fur Volkerkunde (1964)
- Koch, Gerd, Songs of Tuvalu (translated by Guy Slatter), Institute of Pacific Studies, University of the South Pacific (2000) ISBN 9820203147 ISBN 978-9820203143
- Koch, Gerd, Die Materielle Kulture der Ellice-Inseln, Berlin: Museum fur Volkerkunde 1965) The English translation by Guy Slatter, was published as The Material Culture of Tuvalu, University of the South Pacific in Suva (1981) ASIN B0000EE805
- Pulekai A. Sogivalu, Brief History of Niutao, A, (1992) Published by the Institute of Pacific Studies. ISBN 982020058X
