= Ampelosa Manoa Tehulu =

Tuvaluan politician

The Honourable Ampelosa Manoa Tehulu MP
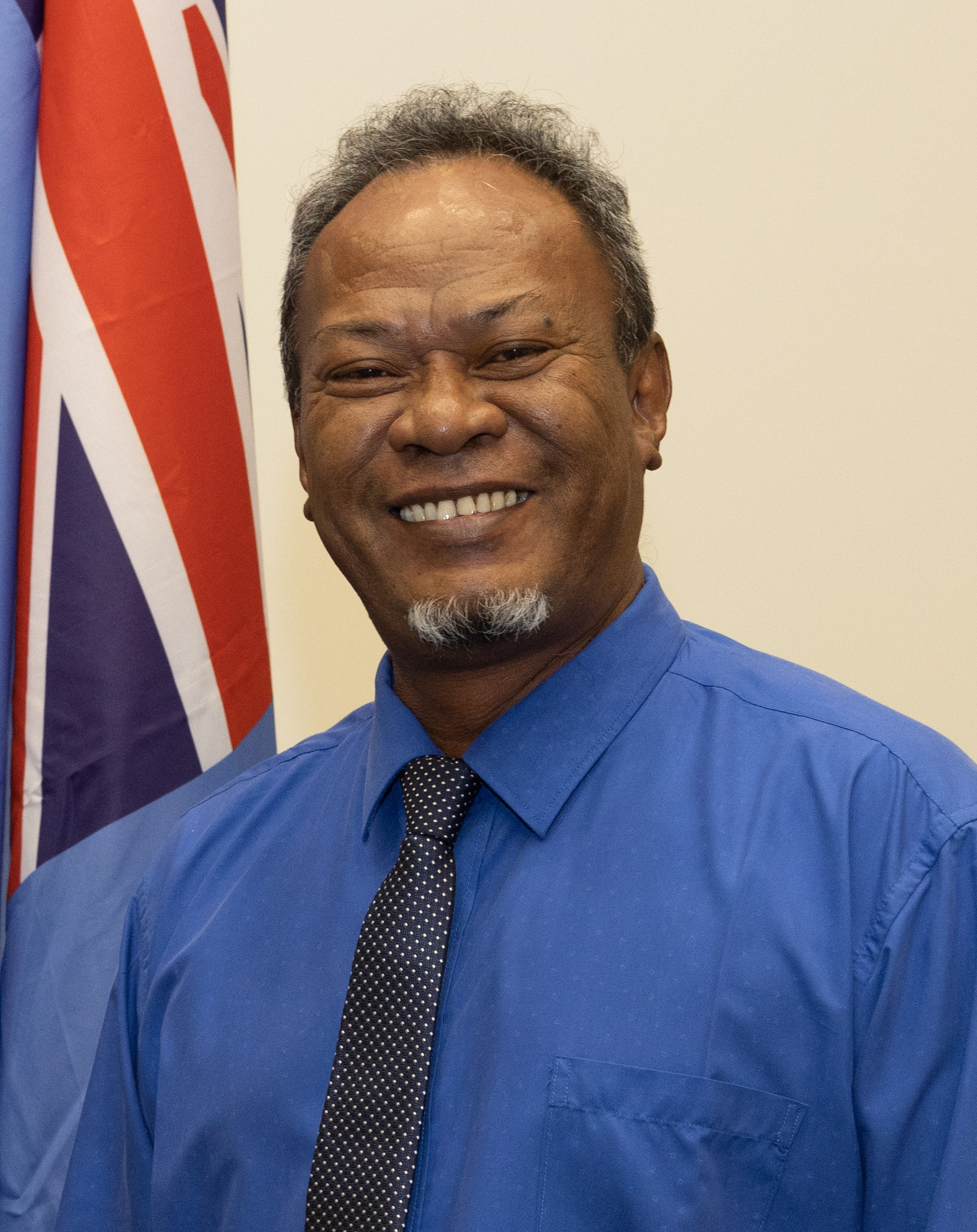
- Ampelosa Manoa Tehulu in 2023

Minister for Public Utilities & Environment
- In office 20 September 2019 – 27 February 2024
- Prime Minister: Kausea Natano

Member of Parliament
- Incumbent
- Assumed office 9 September 2019
- Constituency: Nanumea

Personal details
- Party: Independent

Ampelosa Manoa Tehulu is a Tuvaluan politician.

Tehulu was elected to the Parliament of Tuvalu at the 2019 Tuvaluan general election, and appointed Minister for Public Utilities & Environment in the cabinet of Kausea Natano. He was re-elected in the 2024 Tuvaluan general election.
