= Feleti Teo =

Prime Minister of Tuvalu since 2024

The Right Honourable Feleti Teo OBE MP
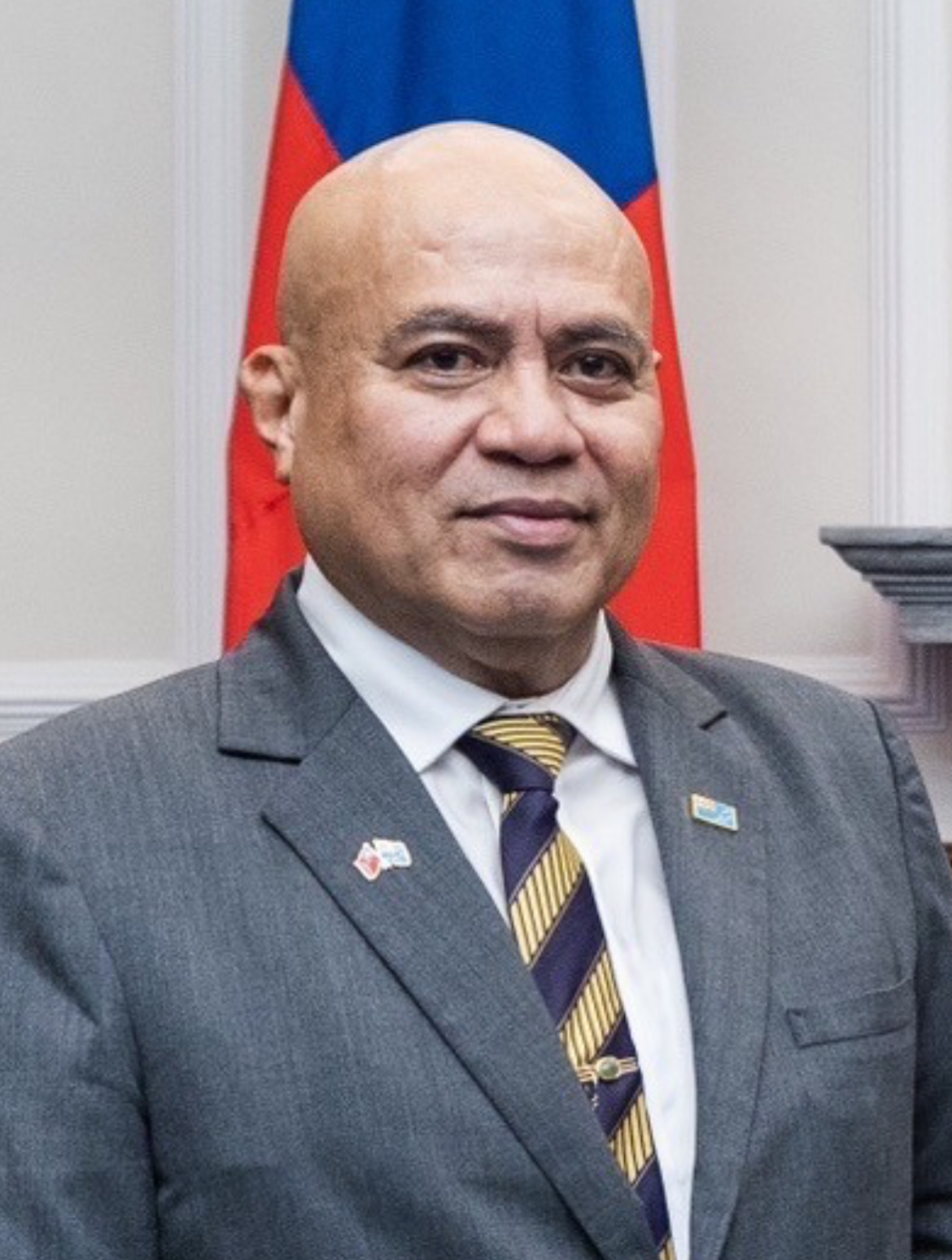
- Teo in 2024

14th Prime Minister of Tuvalu
- Incumbent
- Assumed office 26 February 2024
- Monarch: Charles III
- Governors General: Sir Tofiga Vaevalu Falani; Temukisa Auina Penehuro Hauma
- Deputy: Panapasi Nelesoni
- Preceded by: Kausea Natano

Member of Parliament for Niutao
- Incumbent
- Assumed office 26 January 2024
- Preceded by: Samuelu Teo
Other offices
Executive Director of the Western and Central Pacific Fisheries Commission (WCPFC)
In office December 2014 – December 2022
Acting Secretary General of the Pacific Islands Forum
In office 2 May 2008 – 13 October 2008
| Preceded by | Greg Urwin |
| Succeeded by | Tuiloma Neroni Slade |
Attorney General of Tuvalu
In office 1991–2000
| Preceded by | David Ballantyne |
| Succeeded by | Iakoba Italeli |

Personal details
- Born: Feleti Penitala Teo; 9 October 1962 (age 64)
- Party: Independent
- Spouse: Tausaga Teo
- Relatives: Samuelu Teo (brother)
- Education: University of Canterbury; Australian National University
- Occupation: Politician; civil servant
- Profession: Lawyer

Feleti Penitala Teo (born 9 October 1962) is a Tuvaluan politician and lawyer who is serving as the 14th prime minister of Tuvalu since 2024. He was elected to the Parliament of Tuvalu in the 2024 Tuvaluan general election, with his previous role being the executive director of the Western and Central Pacific Fisheries Commission (WCPFC).

Teo was appointed as prime minister on 26 February 2024, after he was elected unopposed by the parliament.

He is the son of Sir Fiatau Penitala Teo, who was appointed as the first Governor General of Tuvalu (1978–1986) following independence from the United Kingdom.

He has held a number of senior executive positions in multinational organizations in the Oceania region. In 2008, he served as the acting Secretary General of the Pacific Islands Forum. Teo has also served as the Director General of the Forum Fishery Agency (2000–2006). In December 2014 at the 11th regular session of the WCPFC in Apia, Samoa, he was appointed the executive director of the Western and Central Pacific Fisheries Commission (WCPFC), and he continued in that role until December 2022.

== Education ==
Feleti Teo received his Bachelor of Laws degree from the University of Canterbury in Christchurch, New Zealand, and a Master of Laws degree in Public Law from Australian National University in Canberra, Australia. In 1986, he became the first Tuvaluan to qualify as a lawyer upon being admitted as a barrister and solicitor of the High Court of New Zealand.

== Career ==
Teo was the first Tuvaluan to serve as the Attorney General of Tuvalu and Head of Legal and Judicial Services of Tuvalu from 1991 to 2000. His predecessors were expatriates John Wilson, Neil Davidson, Beith Atkinson and David Ballantyne respectively (1978–1991). During Teo's tenure, Cameron Dick served as the Acting Attorney General of Tuvalu from 1995 to 1996 while Teo undertook postgraduate studies at the Australian National University in Canberra. Iakoba Italeli succeeded Teo as the Attorney General of Tuvalu in 2002.

From 2000 to 2006, he was Director General of the Pacific Islands Forum Fisheries Agency (FFA), based in Honiara, Solomon Islands. From 2007 to 2013 he served as Deputy Secretary General of the Pacific Islands Forum Secretariat (PIFS), headquartered in Fiji. After the illness and subsequent death of Security General Greg Urwin of Australia in 2008, he served as the acting Secretary General of the Pacific Islands Forum until Tuiloma Neroni Slade was appointed later that year.

In 2014, Teo was appointed interim secretary general for the newly established regional organisation, the Pacific Islands Development Forum (PIDF), which he held until his appointment to the WCPFC. Teo was appointed to head the WCPFC Secretariat as executive director in December 2014.

Teo was appointed Officer of the Order of the British Empire (OBE) in the 2013 Birthday Honours for services to government.

== Teo Ministry ==
Following his appointment as prime minister, on 27 February 2024 Teo appointed the members of the Cabinet. In March 2024, Teo described his government's top priority was climate change. The development challenges Tuvalu faces were described by Teo as including the need to improve medical and educational services to Tuvalu's outer islands.

The Teo government, in a statement published by Simon Kofe on 28 February 2024, gave support for the "broad principles and objectives" of the Falepili Union, while noting "the absence of transparency and consultations in socializing and informing the public in Tuvalu of such an important and groundbreaking initiative"; and indicated that Tuvalu will seek changes to make it "workable". The statement also address Tuvalu's relations with Taiwan: "The new government wishes to reaffirm its commitment to the long-term and lasting special relationship between Tuvalu and the Republic of China, Taiwan."

In his first interview as prime minister, Teo said, “[o]ur ties with Taiwan are purely based on democratic principles, and they have been very loyal to us." Teo said that the part of the Australia-Tuvalu Falepili Union treaty he wanted to review was the clause stipulating that both countries must “mutually agree” on any security arrangements Tuvalu may want with other countries. In a later interview, Teo said that "[if] there is a way that stops short of revising the treaty that guarantees the integrity of the sovereignty of Tuvalu, then we will certainly explore those options." Subsequently, Teo said he wanted arrangements to guarantee Tuvalu's sovereignty that "stop short of revising the treaty."

On 26 March 2024, Pat Conroy, Australia's Pacific minister, tabled the Falepili Union treaty in the Australian Parliament for the purpose of obtaining ratification of the treaty. Conroy stated "[t]he new government of Tuvalu has confirmed its desire to proceed with the Falepili Union." The Falepili Union had been an issue in the 2024 Tuvaluan general election regarding its impact on the sovereignty of Tuvalu. Conroy confirmed that Australia would work with Tuvalu to ensure its sovereignty was respected; he added that "Australia commits to assist Tuvalu in responding to a major natural disaster, a health pandemic, or military aggression, predicated on Tuvalu requesting such assistance."

Political offices
| Preceded by Kausea Natano | Prime Minister of Tuvalu; 2024–present | Incumbent |
| Preceded by David Ballantyne | Attorney-General of Tuvalu; 1991–2000 | Succeeded by Iakoba Italeli |
