= Nauru Police Force =

Nauru Police Force (NPF)
- Abbreviation: NPF
- Motto: "To promote integrity, be a professional and community-oriented law enforcement body and increase Nauru Police Force's stature in the Pacific region."

Agency overview
- Employees: 80

Jurisdictional structure
- National agency: Nauru
- Operations jurisdiction: Nauru
- Governing body: Government of Nauru
- General nature: Local civilian police

Operational structure
- Headquarters: Civic Centre, Aiwo District (NRU)
- Elected officers responsible: Lionel Aingimea, Minister of Justice and Border Control; Isabella Dageago, Deputy Minister for Justice and Border Control
- Agency executives: Iven Notte, Commissioner of Police; Kalinda Blake, Deputy Commissioner of Police

Facilities
- Nauru Police Stations: Yaren, Nauru
- Vehicles: IVECO vans, Toyota Hilux
- Patrol Boats: 10m Patrol Boat

Website
- Nauru police force.

The Nauru Police Force is the national police force of Nauru. They are responsible for law enforcement and national defence.

== History ==
The force was established through the Nauru Police Force Act of 26 January in 1972, which has been amended several times.

== Structure ==
=== Leadership ===
The current leadership of the Nauru Police Force (NPF) includes:

- Iven Notte — Commissioner of Police
- Kalinda Blake — Deputy Commissioner of Police
- Imran Scotty — Superintendent of the Operations Unit
- Simpson Deidenang — Superintendent of the Crimes Unit
- Gregor Garoa — Superintendent of the Learning and Development Unit
- David Canon — Acting Superintendent of the Operations Support Unit
- Francine Dekarube — Corporate Manager
- Roger Mwareow — Police Chaplain

The Nauru Police Force is under the ministerial responsibility of Lionel Aingimea, while operational command rests with Commissioner Iven Frank Notte.

=== Units ===
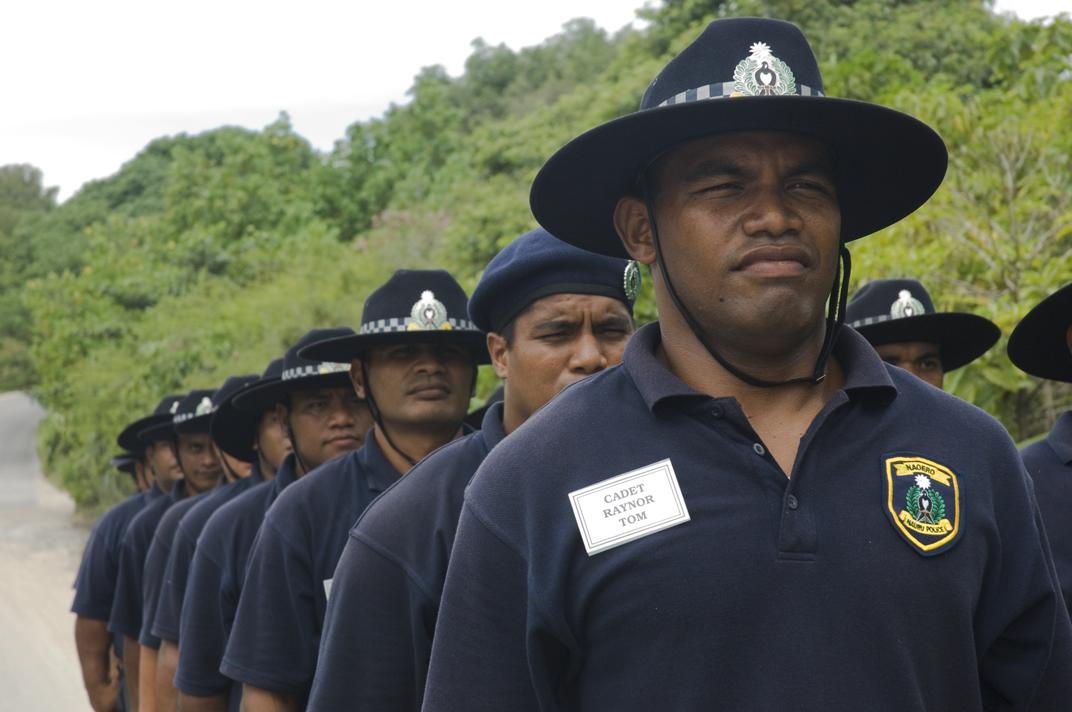
Nauru Cadet Police training in 2007.

The NPF is divided into six units.

- Professional Standards Unit
- Operations Unit
- Crimes Unit
- Learning and Development Unit
- Operations Support Unit
- Maritime Unit

=== Ranks ===
The Nauru Police Force is led by the Commissioner of Police, followed by the Deputy Commissioner, who serves as second-in-command. Superintendents oversee major divisions and units. Other ranks include:

- Commissioner of Police
- Deputy Commissioner of Police
- Superintendent
- Senior Inspector
- Inspector
- Sergeant
- Corporal
- Constable
- Cadet Constable (officially used for recruits or trainees)

== Weapons ==
Police officers in Nauru are not armed while on routine patrol, although as of 2018 the police was estimated to possess 60 firearms. In 2020, 30 M1 Garand Honor Guard (or Squad Performance) rifles were donated by the Taiwanese Embassy to the Nauru Police Force.

== Vehicles ==
Name	Type	Origin	Image	Quantity
Iveco Daily	Police van	Italy		At least 2
Toyota Hilux	Police Pickup Truck	Japan		At least 5
10m Multi-Purpose Coastal Patrol Boats	Police boat	Taiwan		2

== Notable arrests ==
Some notable individuals arrested by the Nauru Police Force include:

- Mathew Batsiua — Former Justice Minister and opposition MP, arrested in connection with the 2015 anti-government protest and later prosecuted as part of the "Nauru 19" case
- Sprent Dabwido — Former President of Nauru, arrested following the 2015 protest and charged as a member of the Nauru 19
- Squire Jeremiah — former Opposition MP arrested and charged in relation to the 2015 protest movement
- Roland Kun — former Opposition MP who was among those linked to the 2015 protest-related proceedings before later leaving Nauru for New Zealand
- John Jeremiah — One of the most prominent defendants in the Nauru 19 case and among those arrested after the 2015 demonstration

The Nauru 19 arrests remain the most internationally known arrests in Nauru's history because they involved senior politicians, a former president, opposition activists, and a major constitutional controversy.

== Commissioners ==
The Commissioner of the Nauru Police Force is the professional head of the national police service. They are responsible for leading operations, managing the force, and ensuring law and order in Nauru. The Commissioner is appointed by the Government (Cabinet), not elected, and serves at the government’s discretion. When the Commissioner is unavailable or the position is vacant, the Cabinet can appoint an Acting Commissioner to carry out the duties temporarily until a permanent appointment is made.

=== List ===
- Robert Lehmann — Commissioner (by 2007–unknown)
- Richard Britten — Commissioner (2012–2013)
- Unknown/not fully documented (2013-2015)
- Kalinda Blake — Acting Commissioner (2015)
- Unknown/not fully documented (2015-2017)
- Kalinda Blake — Acting Commissioner (2017)
- Unknown/not fully documented (2017-2020)
- Iven Notte — Commissioner (2020–present)
- Kalinda Blake — Acting Commissioner (2023;acting while Iven Notte was absent)
- Imran Scotty — Acting Commissioner (2024;acting while Iven Notte was absent)
- Simpson Deidenang — Acting Commissioner (2024;acting while Iven Notte was absent)
