= Mohammed Khan (judge) =

Fijian judge

Mohammed Shafiullah Khan (born in Fiji) is a judge of the Supreme Court of Nauru, appointed in 2014.

== Career ==
Mohammed Khan has over 30 years legal experience, including as a magistrate in Fiji and the Solomon Islands. He is admitted as legal practitioner in Australia.

Judge Khan was appointed by the Nauru Government in 2014. This was subsequent to the deportation of Resident Magistrate Peter Law and the banning from the country of expatriate Chief Justice Australian Geoffrey Eames QC.

These removals occurred after both judicial officers had ordered stays on deportation orders issued by Nauru Justice Minister David Adeang. The actions of the Nauru Government were widely condemned and assistance with funding the justice sector was withdrawn by New Zealand.

In the aftermath of his removal the former Chief Justice Eames urged his replacements to maintain their “independence and courage” against political pressure from the island's government.

In late 2014, the full Bench dismissed a challenge brought by five opposition members of parliament against their indefinite suspensions from parliament.

The opposition members had been suspended in May 2014 for criticising the government in the foreign media and for "unruly behaviour" in parliament. Together the MPs represented one third of the population of the country, who were left disenfranchised as a result. Their suspensions came about at a point where it looked likely the Nauru government would be toppled by a no confidence motion in the parliament.

Judge Khan and his colleagues held the suspensions to be lawful, primarily on the basis that it was a matter for parliament to regulate its own affairs.

In June 2015, the MPs participated in an initially peaceful protest on the country's parliament seeking their re-entry to parliament. Police interrupted the protest using a then recently enacted law that banned the association of three or more citizens without a police permit. The demonstration turned violent and approximately 20 people were arrested including three of the five suspended members of parliament.

As at July 2017, the MPs and their supporters await trial. They have sought a stay of proceedings on the basis that Judge Khan and the other current Supreme Court judge are not sufficiently independent of the Nauru Government to hear their case. It has been reported that former Chief Justice Eames QC is a witness for the accused.

== Judicial plagiarism allegation ==
In June 2017, it was reported by Radio New Zealand that Judge Khan had been accused of plagiarism by an Australian barrister Stephen Lawrence who recognised large portions of a conference paper he had written reproduced without attribution in a judgment delivered by Judge Khan.
