= 2010 in Oceania =

Chronology of Oceania : The thematic eventsof 2010 in Oceania.

== Policy ==
=== Elections ===
- February 27 : Nauruan constitutional referendum in Nauru. The proposed amendments (which would allow the election of the President of the Republic at the direct vote, rather than indirect) were rejected by 67% of the expressed votes.
- April 24 : Nauruan parliamentary election in Nauru. It was anticipated elections, to 'unblock' a Parliament where the presidential government and the opposition each benefited of nine deputies out of eighteen. The eighteen outgoing deputies were however renewed, keeping the country in a political doubt state.
- August 4 : Parliamentary elections in the Solomon Islands.
- August 21 : Parliamentary elections in Australia. The prime minister Julia Gillard, replacing Kevin Rudd at the head of the country following an inner sling in the Labour party, aimed to legitimate her status obtaining a mandate from the citizens, via anticipated elections. The Labours got 72 seats out of 150 at the House of Representatives, as much as the liberal opposition, but could form a government with the support of a green deputy and of three unlabeled deputies.
- Septembre 16 : Parliamentary elections in the Tuvalu.
- 25 novembre : Parliamentary elections in the Tonga. The citizens were led, for the first time, to elect a majority of the deputies. Up to now, the 'People's Representatives' formed a minority at the Parliament, alongside Nobility' Representatives and members of the executive appointed by the king and sat at the Parliament.

=== Governments ===
- Australia
  - queen : Elizabeth II of Australia
  - governor-general : Quentin Bryce
  - prime minister : Julia Gillard
- Cook Islands
  - queen : Elizabeth II of New Zealand
  - queen's representative : Frederick Goodwin
  - prime minister : Jim Marurai (up to the November 30), then Henry Puna
- Fiji
  - Paramount chief : Elizabeth II
  - president : Epeli Nailatikau
  - prime minister : Frank Bainimarama
- Kiribati
  - president : Anote Tong
- Marshall Islands
  - president : Jurelang Zedkaia
- Federated States of Micronesia
  - president : Manny Mori
- Nauru
  - president : Marcus Stephen
- Niue
  - queen : Elizabeth II of New Zealand
  - prime minister : Toke Talagi
- New Zealand
  - queen : Elizabeth II of New Zealand
  - governor general : Anand Satyanand
  - prime minister : John Key
- Palau
  - president : Johnson Toribiong
- Papua New Guinea
  - queen : Elizabeth II of Papua New Guinea
  - governor general : Paulias Matane (up to the December 13), then Michael Ogio (temporarily)
  - prime minister : Michael Somare (Sam Abal ensuring his functions temporarily from the December 14)
- Solomon Islands
  - queen : Elizabeth II of Solomon Islands
  - governor general : Frank Kabui
  - prime minister : Derek Sikua (up to the August 25), then Danny Philip
- Samoa
  - O le Ao O le Malo : Tupua Tamasese Tupuola Tufuga Efi
  - prime minister : Tuilaepa Sailele Malielegaoi
- Tonga
  - king : George Tupou V
  - prime minister : Feleti Sevele (up to the December 21), then Lord Tu‘ivakano
- Tuvalu
  - queen : Elizabeth II of Tuvalus
  - governor general : Filoimea Telito (up to the April 16), then Iakoba Italeli
  - prime minister : Apisai Ielemia (up to the September 29), then Maatia Toafa (up to the December 24), then Willy Telavi
- Vanuatu
  - president : Iolu Abil
  - prime minister : Edward Natapei (up to the December 2), then Sato Kilman

== Environment ==
- November 10 : Ambo Declaration, stemming from the 2010 United Nations Climate Change Conference, in Kiribati

== Death ==
- March : Bernard Narokobi, born in 1937, Papua New Guinean politician, diplomat and philosopher.
- December 4 : Jacques Lafleur, born on the 20 novembre 1932, died on the Gold Coast (Queensland, Australia), New Caledonian politician, old deputy at the French National Assembly (1978-2004), old president of the Assembly of the South Province (1989-2004), historic leader of the anti-independence camp (1977-2004), signatory of the Matignon Agreements in 1988 and of the Nouméa Accord in 1998.
