= Law of Nauru =

Nauruan law, since Nauru's independence from Australia in 1968, is derived primarily from English and Australian common law, though it also integrates indigenous customary law to a limited extent. Nauruan common law is founded mainly on statute law enacted by the Parliament of Nauru, and on precedents set by judicial interpretations of statutes, customs and prior precedents.

== Sources ==
Nauruan law comprises a "number of Ordinances from the pre-independence administration which are still in force; certain laws of the United Kingdom, Papua New Guinea and Australia which have been adopted by Nauru and are still in force; Acts of Parliament passed since independence in 1968; Regulations; precedents of the Supreme Court of Nauru; and customary law". Article 85 of the Constitution stipulates that law in existence at the time of independence continues to be applied until amended or repealed by Parliament.

== Constitution ==
The Constitution of Nauru, adopted in 1968, establishes itself as the supreme law of the country, and provides for the voiding of any statute inconsistent with it (art.2). Art.54(1) grants to the Supreme Court "original jurisdiction to determine any question arising under or involving the interpretation or effect of any provision of th[e] Constitution".

== Statutes ==
Since 12 May 2016 Nauru has a new modern Criminal Code called the Crimes Act 2016, that reforms various crimes and other legislation. The Nauru Crimes Act 2016 also repeals the Queensland Criminal Code of 1899, that the Parliament of Nauru adopted into law (at the time of the independence of Nauru) since 1968.

In addition to British and Australian statutes, and certain regulations applied to Papua New Guinea by Australia during the colonial period, the Parliament of Nauru is the law-making body for Nauru. The law-making process is derived from the legislative process of the British and Australian Parliaments, somewhat simplified as Nauru's Parliament is unicameral. Unlike the United Kingdom or Australia, however, the enactment of laws in Nauru does not require the assent of the head of State. A bill is enacted when it has been passed by Parliament, and certified as such by the Speaker.

== Common law and equity ==
The Constitution makes no reference to common law. However, article 4 of the Custom and Adopted Laws Act 1971 stipulates that "the common law and the statutes of general application [...] which were in force in England on the thirty-first day of January, 1968, are hereby adopted as laws of Nauru"; that "[t]he principles and rules of equity which were in force in England on the thirty-first day of January, 1968, are hereby adopted as the principles and rules of equity in Nauru"; and that "in every civil cause or matter instituted in any Court law and equity shall be administered concurrently". Art.5 specifies that English common law applies only insofar as it is "not repugnant to or inconsistent with the provisions" of any statute law applied in Nauru.

== Case law ==
In addition to applicable case law inherited from England and Australia, Nauruan case law is primarily based on precedents set in the Supreme Court. Due to the country's small size, Nauru has simply one District Court, with appeals heard by the Supreme Court. Appeals may be heard from the Supreme Court to the High Court of Australia on all but constitutional matters, enabling Australian High Court precedents to continue entering Nauruan jurisprudence. Additionally, a Family Court operates separately.

Nauru's Supreme Court has ruled on the following constitutional cases:

- In re the Constitution, Jeremiah v Nauru Local Government Council (1971). Held by Chief Justice Ian Thompson: Article 3 of the Constitution guarantees the "fundamental rights and freedoms of the individual" exclusively within the bounds of the rights explicitly set out in articles 4 to 13. There is no constitutional right to marriage, and marriage may therefore be restricted by statute.
- In re the Constitution of Nauru (1971). Held by Chief Justice Ian Thompson: Any statute restricting the right of Nauruans aged 20 or more to vote in legislative elections is void due to inconsistency with art.29 of the Constitution, which provides that "Members of Parliament shall be elected in such manner as is prescribed by law, by Nauruan citizens who have attained the age of twenty years". Nauruans may not be deprived of the right to vote on the grounds of unsoundness of mind, nor due to being in gaol.
- Three Questions Referred under Articles 36 & 55 of the Constitution (1977). Held by Chief Justice Ian Thompson: Article 32(b) of the Constitution should be interpreted as meaning that any Member of Parliament convicted of an offence punishable by a year or more in gaol vacates his or her seat in Parliament immediately upon conviction, any appeal notwithstanding.
- Four Questions Referred under Article 55 of the Constitution (1977). Held by Chief Justice Ian Thompson: Article 61 of the Constitution "is not intended to exclude the presentation of Bills for supply otherwise than in accordance with [the procedure it sets out for the withdrawal of moneys from the Treasury], if their presentation is otherwise expressly or implicitly authorised by the Constitution". The Supply Act 1977 is not unconstitutional.
- In the Matter of the detention of Uti Siose under Article 5 of the Constitution of Nauru (1982). Held by Chief Justice Ian Thompson: The Criminal Procedure Act 1972 was unconstitutional insofar as it permitted the arrest of a person absconding from bail. Art. 5 of the Constitution provides that "No person shall be deprived of his personal liberty, except [...] (c) upon reasonable suspicion of his having committed, or being about to commit, an, offence"; absconding from bail was not yet an offence at the time of the case.
- the Matter of Article 36 of the Constitution, Reference to the Supreme Court by Bobby Eoe (1988), a case arising under art.36 ("Any question that arises concerning the right of a person to be or to remain a member of Parliament shall be referred to and determined by the Supreme Court"). Held by Chief Justice Donne: Parliament's declaration of vacancy of one of its seats is, in this case, valid in accordance with art.32 of the Constitution.
- Constitutional Reference; In re Article 55 of the Constitution (2003). In accordance with art.55 of the Constitution, which permits the Cabinet to refer a constitutional question to the Supreme Court, Chief Justice Barry Connell held that the Speaker's declaration of a successful parliamentary motion of no confidence against the Cabinet was invalid as it had not met the constitutional requirements for such a motion.
- Constitutional Reference; In re Dual Nationality and Other Questions (2004). Question referred to the Supreme Court by Cabinet in accordance with art.55. Held by Chief Justice Barry Connell: "There is no direct prohibition on a member of Parliament holding dual citizenship."
- In the Matter of Article 55 & 45 (and Article 36 & 40) of the Constitution (2007). Chief Justice Robin Millhouse QC answered questions submitted by Cabinet (in accordance with art.55) on the meaning of articles 36, 40 and 45 of the Constitution.
- In the Matter of Article 55 & 45 (and Article 36 & 40) of the Constitution (2008). Similar to the above. Answered by Millhouse CJ.
- In re Article 36 of the National Constitution (2008). Held by Chief Justice Robin Millhouse QC: The Speaker must consult the Supreme Court before declaring a seat in Parliament vacant.
- In the Matter of the Constitution and in the Matter of the Dissolution of the Eighteenth Parliament (2010). Held by Justice John von Doussa: The Constitution provides the President with full latitude to determine whether a state of emergency should be declared.

== Custom ==
The Constitution makes no reference to custom. However, the Custom and Adopted Laws Act 1971 provides that the "institutions, customs and usages of the [indigenous] Nauruans" existing prior to the commencement of the Act shall have "full force and effect of law" to regulate certain issues of land ownership, other issues of property and inheritance, and more generally "any matters affecting [indigenous] Nauruans only". A custom is invalid to the extent that it would deprive a person of his or her property without his or her consent, or that it would "deprive the parents of a child of its custody and control without their consent". A custom may be "expressly, or by necessary implication, abolished, altered or limited by any law enacted by Parliament"; statute law prevails over custom.

== Reform ==
In January 2011, Mathew Batsiua, Minister for Health, Justice and Sports, addressed the United Nations Human Rights Council within the context of Nauru's Universal Periodic Review. Summarising Nauru's report to the council, he stated that the country was undergoing legal reforms with an aim to improve guarantees on human rights. He drew the council's attention, in particular, to the Nauruan constitutional referendum of 2010, which had aimed unsuccessfully to amend the Constitution and expand its Bill of Rights. Batsiua stated: "Had the referendum received the required support, the constitutionally guaranteed rights and freedoms of the people of Nauru would have been something that all nations of the world might have aspired to. It would have been the first Constitution in the world to protect the rights of disabled persons, and the second in the region, after Papua New Guinea, to provide for the protection of environmental rights. It would have prohibited the death penalty, guaranteed the rights of children, recognised the right to receive education and health. It would have enshrined the right to receive maternity leave, and introduced a right to access information, among other things." In addition, he stated Parliament was considering institutional and legal reforms to create the office of an ombudsman, and review Nauru's criminal code, "much of which remains unchanged since [...] 1899". The decriminalisation of "homosexual activity between consenting adults" was "under active consideration".
