= Nauru government crackdown on opposition (2014–2015) =

In January 2014, Nauru's President Baron Waqa fired the country's only magistrate Peter Law, and cancelled the visa of its Chief Justice Geoffrey Eames (both Australian-based justices). Law was fired after issuing an injunction to temporarily halt the deportation of three foreign nationals. Eames issued an injunction in an unsuccessful attempt to temporarily halt Law's deportation. Eames was in Australia at the time and his visa was cancelled, preventing his return to Nauru.

In the same month, the application fee for visas for foreign journalists was raised from $200 to $8000.

In May and June 2014, Waqa suspended 5 of the 7 members of Nauru's Opposition from Parliament indefinitely.

Three of the MPs, Mathew Batsiua, Kieren Keke and Roland Kun, were suspended in May 2014 for making comments to international media critical of the government and the alleged breakdown of the rule of law. Another two, Sprent Dabwido (a former president) and Squire Jeremiah were suspended a month later for behaving in an unruly manner.

In June 2015, Jeremiah, Dabwido, and Batsiua were arrested and Kun had his passport cancelled amid claims that they had been trying to destabilise the Government by talking to foreign media.

19 people were charged with unlawful assembly and other offences following a protest outside the Parliament of Nauru on 16 June 2015. 3 pleaded guilty and the District Court sentenced 2 to imprisonment for 3 months and the 3rd to 6 months imprisonment. The Supreme Court of Nauru allowed an appeal, finding that the sentences were manifestly inadequate and increased them to 14 months and 22 months imprisonment. The High Court of Australia quashed the decision and remitted it to the Supreme Court "differently constituted, for hearing according to law."

The charges against Jeremiah, Dabwido, and Batsiua had a long and complex history. On 21 June 2018 Justice Geoff Muecke in the Supreme Court of Nauru ordered Nauru to pay their costs of defending the charges, in the amount of $224,021.90. Nauru did not pay this amount and on 13 September 2018 Justice Muecke ordered a permanent stay of the proceedings against them. The Nauru government is appealing this decision to the Nauru Court of Appeal and will be heard by Michael Scott, the former Chief Justice of Tonga, John Muria, the Chief Justice of Kiribati and Nicholas Kirriwom, a judge of the Supreme Court of Papua New Guinea.

== See also ==
- Nauru 19
