= Nauru Court of Appeal =

Highest court in the Republic of Naoero

- Appeals from: Supreme Court of Nauru
- Website: naurujudiciary.gov.nr/court-of-appeal/

President
- Currently: Justice Rangajeeva Wimalasena

The Nauru Court of Appeal is the highest court in the judicial system of the Republic of Naoero.

== History ==
In 1976, Nauru entered into a treaty with Australia, in which litigants could appeal a decision of the Supreme Court of Nauru to the High Court of Australia, which would serve as the final court of appeal. Under the treaty, the High Court's jurisdiction was limited to cases that did not involve the interpretation or effect of the Nauru Constitution, the membership of the Nauru Parliament, or appeals from the Nauru Lands Committee.

This arrangement between Nauru and Australia, in which appeals were taken to the court of a foreign country, was possibly the only one in the world.

== Members ==
- Justice Rangajeeva Wimalasena - President of the Court of Appeal
- Justice Filimone Jitoko - former Chief Justice of Nauru
- Justice Prasantha de Silva
- Sir Albert Rocky Palmer - Chief Justice of Solomon Islands
- Justice Dr Shirani Bandaranayake - former Chief Justice of Sri Lanka
- Justice Colin Makail
- Justice Sir John Muria - former Chief Justice of Kiribati

== See also ==
- Law of Nauru
