= Politics of Nauru =

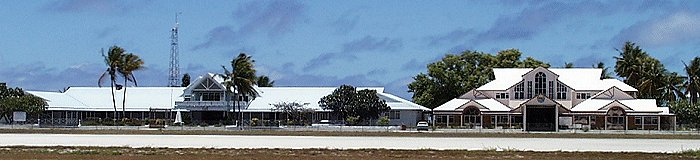
Government of Nauru

The politics of Nauru, officially the Republic of Naoero, take place in a framework of a parliamentary representative democratic republic, whereby the President of Nauru is the head of government of the executive branch. Legislative power is vested in both the government and the parliament. The Judiciary is independent of the executive and the legislature.

== Political conditions ==
=== Economy ===
Nauru's economic viability has historically rested on its phosphate reserves. Phosphate has been mined on the island since 1906. After its independence in 1968, this small Pacific nation generated healthy revenues from this lucrative—but finite—resource. The phosphate supply has been largely exhausted in recent years, and the economy has declined since its peak near 1980.

=== Offshore banking ===
In this regard, the government has tried to develop the island into an offshore financial centre, imitating the success of the Bahamas and other island nations around the world that have emerged as major offshore banking centres. The government has also invested in property on other islands and the United States through its Nauru Phosphate Royalties Trust.

Over the course of recent years, however, offshore banking institutions and instruments have come under increasing scrutiny by international bodies seeking to make international finance a more transparent system. Nauru, as a result, has been a casualty of this movement.

In December 1999, four major international banks banned dollar transactions with Nauru. The United States Department of State issued a report identifying Nauru as a major money laundering centre, used by narcotics traffickers and organized crime figures.

=== Shifting governments ===
Nauru had 17 changes of administration between 1989 and 2003. President Bernard Dowiyogo was first elected in 1976 and served as President till 1978, he returned to that office in 1989, and was re-elected again in 1992.

A vote in parliament, however, forced him to yield power to Kinza Clodumar in 1995. Dowiyogo regained the presidency when the Clodumar government fell in mid-1998.

In April 2000, René Harris, former chairman of the Nauru Phosphate Corporation, became president as he briefly assembled support in parliament. Harris' attempt to put together an administration lasted for only a few days of parliamentary maneuvering. In the end, Harris proved unable to secure parliament's confidence, and Dowiyogo returned yet again to the presidency by the end of the month, taking office in April 2000 for his fourth and, after a minimal hiatus, fifth stints as Nauru's top executive.

Bernard Dowiyogo died in office in March 2003 and Ludwig Scotty was elected as the president, later being re-elected to serve a full term in October 2004.

Following a vote of no confidence on 19 December 2007, Scotty was replaced by Marcus Stephen. Stephen resigned in November 2011, and Freddie Pitcher became president. Sprent Dabwido then filed a motion of no confidence in Pitcher, resulting in him becoming president. Following parliamentary elections in 2013, Baron Waqa was elected president. He held the presidential title six years from 2013 to 2019, but in January 2014 an institutional crisis occurred when the President started a systematic campaign of repression against the opposition and the judicial branch of the government.

President Waqa was a strong supporter of Australia keeping refugees in a refugee camp on Nauru soil. He lost his parliamentary seat in the 2019 Nauruan parliamentary election, meaning he could not be re-elected.

In August 2019 the parliament elected former human rights lawyer Lionel Aingimea as the new president of Nauru.

=== Environmental concerns ===
Phosphate depletion will likely be one of the most important considerations for the government in the next few years as the supply was forecast to be exhausted by 2023. Since Nauru imports almost everything it consumes (including food, water and fuel) the need to diversify the economy and to generate other sources of revenue is of paramount importance.

As noted above, offshore banking has been one arena into which Nauru has traversed, however, the rewards are limited by growing concern about the ethical parameters of this business. Tourism is another industry that is also being gradually built.

Yet another concern is the ecological damage that resulted from a century of phosphate mining by the United Kingdom, Australia and New Zealand were responsible for the large scale and indiscriminate mining of phosphate on the tiny island for most of the 20th century.

The mining left an ecological and economic disaster for Nauru to handle when the country achieved independence in 1968. Not only was the country's principal resource and employment generating activity almost entirely depleted by the rapid mining done by the three countries, the mining companies had also failed to follow the basic principles of restoring and regenerating the lands where mining had been completed. Thus, Nauru was left to handle the immense and expensive task of restoring large chunks of land which were destroyed by the mining.

Nauru demanded compensation from the three nations, but was refused. Finally, in 1993, Nauru was forced to turn to the International Court of Justice at The Hague in The Netherlands. It filed a claim of $73 million against the three countries. The case was soon afterwards settled out of court by Australia, with Britain and New Zealand also contributing to the reparations sought by Nauru.

Today, Nauru is almost totally dependent on trade with New Zealand, Australia and Fiji. Arable land is very limited as are all other natural resources, now that its long-time economic base of phosphate mines has been almost completely depleted.

=== Foreign policy ===
On the international front, in late July 2002, Taiwan cut its diplomatic ties with Nauru. Taiwan and Nauru had shared diplomatic ties for 22 years; Taiwan has enjoyed diplomatic ties with several Pacific countries even in the face of the "One China policy" by Beijing. Nevertheless, this particular 22-year-long legacy was broken when Nauru's president decided to change its allegiance and establish formal relations with the People's Republic of China. The move effectively shifted diplomatic recognition from Taipei to Beijing, thus angering the government of Taiwan, which described the shift in policy as "reckless."

Nauru's decision to recognise Beijing via the signing of diplomatic papers and a joint communique ultimately resulted in the cessation of Taiwanese aid. Nauru instead received a US$150 million aid package from Beijing.

In April 2005, during a state visit to the Marshall Islands, President Chen Shui-bian of Taiwan met and spoke with the Nauruan President Ludwig Scotty. On 14 May 2005, the two countries signed the necessary documents to restore formal ties and reopen embassies. The People's Republic of China consequently severed ties two weeks later on 31 May.

=== Internal disputes ===
In early 2003, a fight for power emerged between President Rene Harris and former President Bernard Dowiyogo. The power struggle occurred following a non-confidence vote in parliament, which effectively ejected Harris from the position of president. Reports suggested that Harris was ousted because of rising anxieties regarding economic mismanagement. At the time, Dowiyogo referred to Nauru's political scenario as being "critical."

It was reported that Dowiyogo became the president replacing Harris, however, information surrounding the shift in power was sparse. There was very little international coverage of the matter. Regardless, Dowiyogo's tenure did not last for long. In March 2003, Dowiyogo underwent heart surgery in the United States and died.

=== 2003 – present ===
In May 2003, elections were held within the parliament to select a new president. In those elections, Ludwig Scotty gained the most support and became the new president. The actual results of the parliamentary vote were as follows: Ludwig Scotty—10 parliamentary votes, Kinza Clodumar—7 parliamentary votes. President Scotty became president on 29 May 2003. He served only until August 2003 when he was ousted in a non-confidence measure. Rene Harris was elected as president.

Meanwhile, in parliamentary elections held in May 2003, Nauru First Party won 3 seats and independents garnered 15 in total.

In late June 2004, Nauru's former parliament speaker Ludwig Scotty became the country's new president. His presidency followed the exit of outgoing President Rene Harris following yet another non-confidence measure.

For his part, Scotty had resigned as parliamentary speaker in April 2004 in protest of the Nauru's financial crisis which included the commencement of receivership proceedings by corporate giant, General Electric. During that period, Nauru faced the seizure of its assets if the country failed to honour its debt payments.

After Scotty's resignation as parliamentary speaker, the parliament was unable to convene as members of parliament could not decide whom to appoint as his replacement. The scenario led to a political crisis, the financial crisis notwithstanding.

In mid-2004, the government of Australia sent envoys to help Nauru deal with its financial crisis. By August 2004, a report by the Australian Centre for Independent Studies suggested that Nauru might consider relinquishing its independent status in favor of becoming an Australian territory. The report called for radical economic reform as well as the restructuring of both governmental instruments and public service. The author of the report has offered Nauru economic advice in the past.

Scotty was re-elected to serve a full term in October 2004. Following a vote of no confidence by Parliament against President Scotty on 19 December 2007, Marcus Stephen became the President. Following Stephen's resignation in November 2011, Freddie Pitcher became president. Sprent Dabwido then moved a motion of no confidence in Pitcher, and Dabwido was duly elected president by the parliament, with nine votes supporting his nomination and eight votes opposing.

Elections for Parliament were held in 2013, after which Baron Waqa was elected by Parliament as president. He held the presidential title six years from 2013 to 2019. President Waqa was a strong supporter of Australia keeping refugees in a refugee camp on Nauru soil. The incumbent president lost his parliamentary seat in 2019 Nauruan parliamentary election, meaning he lost his bid for re-election. In August 2019 the parliament elected former human rights lawyer Lionel Aingimea as the new president of Nauru. Following the 2022 Nauruan parliamentary election, Russ Kun was elected president to succeed Aingimea. On 30 October 2023, David Ranibok Adeang was elected President of the Republic of Nauru.

=== Crackdowns on Opposition politicians ===
In January 2014, Nauru's President Baron Waqa fired the country's only magistrate Peter Law and its Chief Justice Geoffrey Eames (both Australian-based justices). Eames, himself, was fired after issuing an injunction to temporarily halt Law's deportation.

In May and June 2014, Waqa suspended 5 of the 7 members of Nauru's Opposition from Parliament indefinitely.

Three of the MPs, Mathew Batsiua, Kieren Keke and Roland Kun, were suspended in May 2014 for making comments to international media critical of the government and the alleged breakdown of the rule of law. Another two, Sprent Dabwido (a former president) and Squire Jeremiah were suspended a month later for behaving in an unruly manner.

In June 2015, Jeremiah, Dabwido, and Batsiua were arrested and Kun had his passport cancelled amid claims that they had been trying to destabilize the Government by talking to foreign media.

== Executive branch ==
Main office-holders
Office	Name	Party	Since
President of Nauru	David Adeang	Nonpartisan	30 October 2023
Vice President of Nauru	Lionel Aingimea	Nonpartisan	16 April 2026

The Parliament elects a president from amongst its members, who appoints Cabinet of Nauru of 5–6 people. The President is both the head of state and head of government.

A series of no-confidence votes, resignations and elections between 1999 and 2003 saw René Harris and Bernard Dowiyogo as President for numerous short periods during a period of political instability. Dowigoyo died in office on 10 March 2003, in Washington, D.C., after heart surgery. Ludwig Scotty was elected President on 29 May 2003, but this did not bring to an end the years of political uncertainty as he was replaced by Harris a few months later. Scotty regained the presidency in 2004, only to be ousted in a vote of no confidence in 2007.

=== President ===
The president of Nauru is elected by Parliament from among its members, and is both the head of state and the head of government of Nauru. Nauru's unicameral Parliament has 19 members, with an electoral term of three years. Political parties only play a minor role in Nauru politics, and there have often been periods of instability in the Presidential office. Shifting allegiances among a small number of individuals can lead to frequent changes in the makeup of the government, including who occupies the office of the president.

=== Vice President ===
The position of Vice President of Nauru was established on 16 April 2026. The vice president acts as an assistant to the president and serves in the president's stead when the president is absent. The current and inaugural vice president is Lionel Aingimea.

=== Cabinet ===
The Cabinet of Nauru is the executive branch of the government of the Republic of Nauru, a small island nation in the Pacific Ocean. Article 17 (1.) of the Constitution of Nauru provides for the "executive authority of Nauru" to be vested in "a Cabinet constituted as provided by this Part" with the "general direction and control of the government of Nauru", specified in Article 17 (2.) as being "collectively responsible" to the Parliament of Nauru. The Cabinet is directly appointed by the President of Nauru, and comprises the president, who presides over meetings over the Cabinet, and either four or five members of the parliament. The president is also responsible for assigning Members of the Cabinet, including himself, "responsibility for any business of the government of Nauru", as ministers. Members of the Cabinet are required to swear or affirm an oath of office prior to being appointed.

== Legislative branch ==
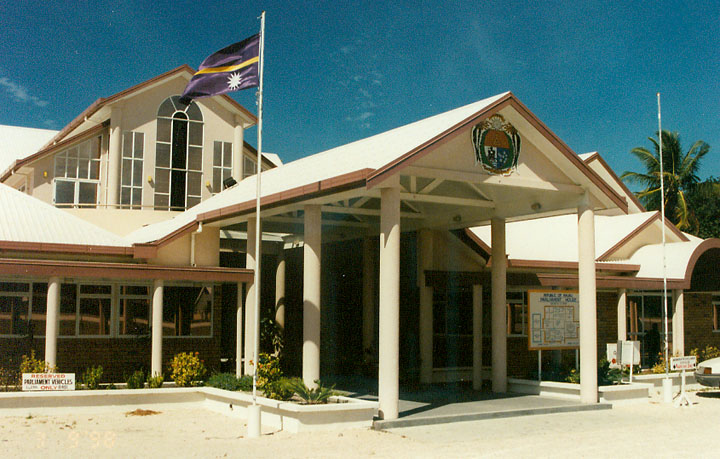
Nauru parliament

Parliament has 19 members, elected for a three-year term in multi-seat constituencies. Each constituency returns 2 members to the Nauruan Parliament, except for Meneng and Ubenide which returns 3 and 4 respectively. Voting is compulsory for all citizens aged 20 or more.

== Political parties and elections ==
Nauru does not have a formal structure for political parties; candidates typically stand as independents. 15 of the 18 members of the current parliament are independents, and alliances within the government are often formed on the basis of extended family ties. Four parties that have been active in Nauruan politics are the Nauru Party, the Democratic Party, Nauru First and the Centre Party.

== Judicial branch ==
For its size, Nauru has a complex legal system. The Supreme Court, headed by the Chief Justice, is paramount on constitutional issues. Other cases can be appealed to the two-judge Appellate Court. Parliament cannot overturn court decisions, but Appellate Court rulings can be appealed to the High Court of Australia; in practice, this rarely happens. Lower courts consist of the District Court and the Family Court, both of which are headed by a Resident Magistrate, who also is the Registrar of the Supreme Court. Finally, there also are two quasi-courts: the Public Service Appeal Board and the Police Appeal Board, both of which are presided over by the Chief Justice.

== Local government ==
Since 1992, local government has been the responsibility of the Nauru Island Council (NIC). The NIC has limited powers and functions as an advisor to the national government on local matters. The role of the NIC is to concentrate its efforts on local activities relevant to Nauruans. An elected member of the Nauru Island Council cannot simultaneously be a member of parliament. Land tenure in Nauru is unusual: all Nauruans have certain rights to all land on the island, which is owned by individuals and family groups; government and corporate entities do not own land and must enter into a lease arrangement with the landowners to use land. Non-Nauruans cannot own lands.

== Armed forces ==
Australia is responsible for Nauru's defense under an informal agreement between the two countries. However, there is a 100-person regular police force under civilian command, backed by volunteer reservists trained to provide support in the event of serious unrest. While officers are typically unarmed while on routine patrol, the Nauruan police force does possess 60 firearms.

== See also ==
- Naoero Amo
- Commonwealth
- Nauruan diplomatic missions
