= 2021 Nauruan constitutional referendum =

- 13 November 2021
- Should the membership of parliament including the office of the president and ministers be reserved for Nauruans and their descendants who became Nauruan citizens in 1968 when the Constitution came into force?

Results
Choice	Votes	%
Yes	4,572	71.19%
No	1,850	28.81%
Valid votes	6,422	98.95%
Invalid or blank votes	68	1.05%
Total votes	6,490	100.00%
Registered voters/turnout	7,903	82.12%

A constitutional referendum was held in Nauru on 13 November 2021. The referendum was the result of government proposal to amend article 31 of the constitution to bar naturalised citizens and their descendants from becoming members of parliament, or holding the presidency or ministerial posts. The proposal was approved by 71% of voters.

Voting was compulsory, with a fine for non-voters.

== Results ==
Voters were asked the question "Should the membership of parliament including the office of the president and ministers be reserved for Nauruans and their descendants who became Nauruan citizens in 1968 when the Constitution came into force".

Choice	Votes	%
For	4,572	71.19
Against	1,850	28.81
Total	6,422	100.00
Valid votes	6,422	98.95
Invalid/blank votes	68	1.05
Total votes	6,490	100.00
Registered voters/turnout	7,903	82.12
Source: Electoral Commission

== Aftermath ==
Following the referendum, the government introduced a bill to amend article 31, adding four new disqualifications for becoming a member of parliament. These disqualified anyone living on the island at the time of independence who did not become a Nauruan citizen at independence, descendants of those who did not become citizens at independence, anyone gaining citizenship by naturalisation and descendants of those who gained citizenship by naturalisation.
