= Nauru International Port =

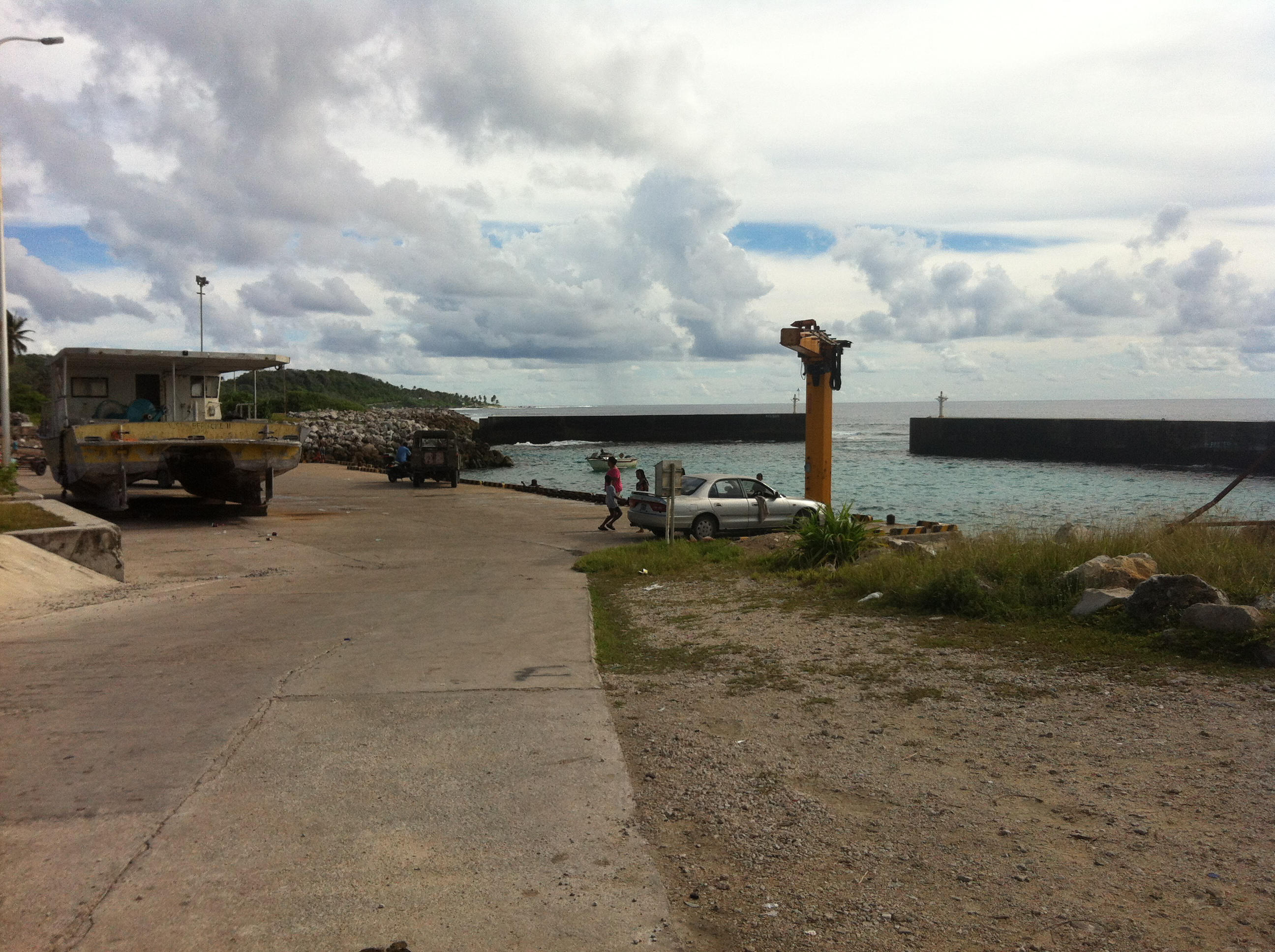
- Nauru Port in 2014, prior to redevelopment
- Interactive map of Nauru International Port

Location
- Country: Nauru
- Location: Aiwo District
- Coordinates: 0.52904°S 166.91054°E

Details
- Opened: TBD
- Operated by: Nauru Maritime Port Authority
- Owned by: Government of Nauru
- No. of wharfs: 1
- Employees: 60

Statistics
- Website https://www.nauruport.com/

The Nauru International Port is a seaport which is currently under construction in Nauru in the Pacific Ocean. It will become the country's first international seaport and improve commerce and connectivity for the island nation. The $79.59 million USD project will be a climate change-proof port which will be vital in receiving necessary supplies such as fuel, food, and medical supplies. The new port, which was originally expected to open in December 2020, is anticipated to fit Nauru's needs until at least 2050.

== History ==
Nauru had planned for a large, maritime port for over a century. To receive supplies, large ships would dock offshore and ferry cargo containers to the 111-year-old Aiwo Boat Harbor in a process that was unsafe, difficult, and inefficient.

After the project was greenlighted in September 2019, construction of the port began the following month at the site of the aged harbor with funding from the Asian Development Bank, Green Climate Fund, the governments of Australia and Nauru, and the Nauru Sustainable and Climate Resilient Connectivity Project. In preparation for the anticipated 2021 opening sixty local workers were trained in modern port practices such as safety, maintenance and stevedoring.

By March 2022 the second family moved into a newly constructed house as part of the Red Zone Rehabilitation Project. As part of the scheme, families whose property was encroached upon by the enlargement of the port area were given a house with a construction cost of $64,000 AUD paid for by the Nauruan government. It was anticipated that 250 individuals would receive a new home as part of the program. The $2.3m project addresses safety concerns related to living close to the construction site and the already-unsafe conditions of the structures which were originally built in the early to mid-twentieth century to house Chinese and Caroline Islanders brought to Nauru by the British to work in the phosphate industry. In May of that year the ADB provided another $15 million grant to cover additional costs caused by the COVID-19 pandemic.
