= Vice President of Nauru =

Second-highest office in Nauru

Vice President of Naoero
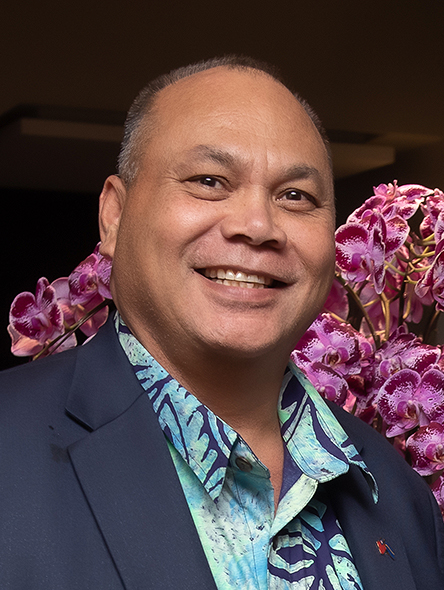
- Incumbent; Lionel Aingimea since 16 April 2026
- Executive branch of the Government of the Republic of Nauru; Cabinet of the Republic of Nauru
- Member of: Cabinet
- Reports to: President
- Appointer: President
- Formation: 16 April 2026
- First holder: Lionel Aingimea

The Vice President of Nauru, officially the Vice President of Naoero, is the second-highest official in the government and supports the president in leading the country. The role includes helping manage government policies, overseeing ministries, and assisting with national decision-making. If the president is absent or unable to perform their duties, the vice president may act on the president's behalf. The position was formally strengthened through recent constitutional reforms to improve stability and leadership within Nauru's government. As a senior member of the cabinet, the vice president also represents Nauru in regional and international matters when required. The current Vice President is Lionel Aingimea, he was appointed on 16 April 2026.

== Background ==
Nauru has had Minister Assisting the President appointed by President since 1968 to deputize the President, and to provide an acting president in case of a vacancy, which happened once in March 2003. In January 2026, a constitutional amendment was introduced to formalize the succession by introducing vice presidential position. The Office of the Vice-President of Nauru supports the Vice-President in carrying out executive and ministerial responsibilities. The Vice-President assists the President and may perform presidential duties when required under the Constitution of Nauru. The office is headed by the Vice-President, who also holds ministerial portfolios within the Government of Nauru.

== Office of the Vice-President ==
The Office of the Vice-President of Nauru supports the Vice-President in carrying out executive and ministerial responsibilities. The Vice-President assists the President and may perform presidential duties when required under the Constitution of Nauru. The office is headed by the Vice-President, who also holds ministerial portfolios within the Government of Nauru.

=== Key Officials ===
Current senior officials and roles include:

Position	Incumbent
Vice President of Nauru, Minister Assisting the President	Lionel Rouwen Aingimea
Chief of Staff to the Vice President	Nina-Marlei Bill
Special Adviser to the Vice President	Joy Waqa
Senior Personal Assistant to the Minister Assisting the President	Kuni Teimitsi

== Appointment ==
The Vice President of Nauru is appointed by the President of Nauru from among the elected members of the Parliament of Nauru. Because Nauru uses a parliamentary system, the president selects ministers and senior government officials directly from parliament after forming a government. The office of vice president became more formally established through recent constitutional reforms designed to strengthen political stability, improve succession procedures, and provide clearer executive leadership within government.

After appointment, the vice president serves as the second-highest official in the government and assists the president in managing national administration, cabinet affairs, and government policy. The vice president may also represent the president at official events, oversee assigned ministries, and act on behalf of the president during absences or temporary incapacity. Like other ministers in Nauru, the vice president remains a sitting member of parliament while serving in executive office.

== List of Vice Presidents ==
Image	Name	President	Took office	Left office
	Lionel Aingimea	David Adeang	16 April 2026	Incumbent
