= 2010 Nauruan constitutional referendum =

- 27 February 2010
- Do you approve of the proposed law entitled Constitution of Nauru (Referendum Amendments) Bill 2009?

Results
Choice	Votes	%
Yes	1,450	33.04%
No	2,939	66.96%
Valid votes	4,389	98.17%
Invalid or blank votes	82	1.83%
Total votes	4,471	100.00%
Registered voters/turnout	5,238	85.36%
- Results by district

A constitutional referendum was held in Nauru on 27 February 2010. Voters were asked to vote on amendments to the constitution, most notably a change to a directly elected president (instead of one chosen by parliament) and a strengthening of human rights legislation (but also a clarification of the distribution of powers and other, less notable amendments). A two-thirds majority was required for the amendments to pass.

The referendum was part of a large-scale constitutional renewal; the referendum had to be held to approve changes to some especially protected parts of the constitution, while other changes were made by simple parliamentary vote. Any changes would only take effect on the day of the next general election, likely in May/June 2011.

Turnout was 85%; the constitutional changes were rejected by majority of two thirds, almost 3,000 votes. It was considered immediately afterwards whether another referendum might be held at a later time.

== Results ==
Choice	Votes	%
For	1,450	33.04
Against	2,939	66.96
Total	4,389	100.00
Valid votes	4,389	98.17
Invalid/blank votes	82	1.83
Total votes	4,471	100.00
Registered voters/turnout	5,238	85.36
Source: Direct Democracy, Ratuva
