= Nauru 19 =

Group of defendants in Nauru

The Nauru 19 were a group of defendants in cases related to an anti-government protest in Yaren, Nauru in 2015. They faced a long, delayed trial, with alleged government interference. Initially, the case was thrown out on 13 September 2018, however, the government appealed, overturning the permanent stay. In the subsequent retrial, the fifteen remaining members of the group were sentenced to up to a maximum of 11 months in prison in December 2019. All of the protestors were released by April 2020.

== Background ==
On 16 June 2015, there was an anti-government protest outside of the parliament building in Yaren, attended by hundreds. The protest was in response to the suspension of five opposition MPs since 2014 by the Baron Waqa government. The suspended MPs included Mathew Batsiua, former President Sprent Dabwido, Squire Jeremiah, and Roland Kun. These MPs were accused by the government of attempting to destabilize Nauru through the foreign press. The protest eventually spilled into the airfield and resulted in minor damage to the parliament building. A number of police officers were also injured. Extra police were put on duty following the protests.

Nineteen protestors were charged with offenses such as serious assault, rioting, and disturbing the legislature. The nineteen people charged were Meshack Akubor, Mathew Batsiua, Pisoni Bop, Job Cecil, Sprent Dabwido, Grace Detageouwa, Estakai Foilape, Mereiya Helstead, Dabub Jeremiah, Daniel Jeremiah, John Jeremiah, Rutherford Jeremiah, Squire Jeremiah, Joram Joram, Bureka Kakioua, Jacki Kanath, Josh Kepae, Renack Mau, and Piroy Mau. MP Kun denied involvement in the protest and fled to New Zealand in July 2016.

== Trial ==
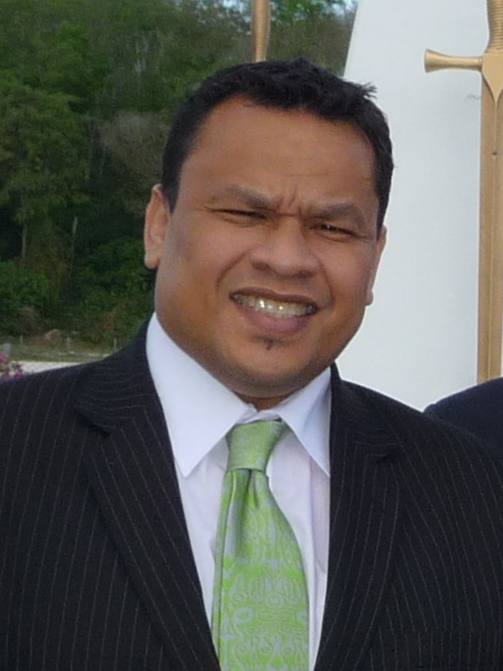
Sprent Dabwido, former president and one of the Nauru 19 defendants.

In 2016, three of the Nauru 19, John Jeremiah, Josh Kepae, and Job Cecil, pleaded guilty. After their prison sentences were extended by the Supreme Court of Nauru, they were able to successfully appeal to the High Court of Australia. After the High Court sent the matter back to the Supreme Court, the latter extended the prison sentences again. When the three protestors attempted to appeal to the High Court again, the Nauruan government had severed ties with the High Court on 13 March 2018, days before the due date of the appeal. This effectively removed the final possible avenue for appeal from the three protestors.

After failing to obtain legal representation from Nauru, the Nauru 19 sought it in Australia, and, in 2016, received a five-person legal team, which represented them pro bono. The lawyers sought payment from the Nauruan government. The government passed the Civil Procedures Amendment 2018 in June, which limited, among other things, the maximum legal fees payable per case to US$2,231. Judge Geoff Muecke, an Australian judge contracted to hear the Nauru 19's criminal case, ruled the legislation unconstitutional, and demanded the Nauruan government pay the Australian lawyers the full value of US$166,606 by 29 June. The payment due date passed without comment by the Nauruan government. In early July, the government announced its intention to appeal the ruling against the Civil Procedures Amendment Act. Justice Minister David Adeang found the amount of money ordered by the court to paid to the Australian lawyers to be excessive.

On 30 July 2018, the Nauru 19 asked in court to have the case against them thrown out. Reasons given for this request included the delay to court the case faced earlier, as well as the failure of the government to follow the court order to pay the Nauru 19's lawyers. The government expressed intention to appeal if such a stay was given. The Nauru 19 were granted a permanent stay by Judge Muecke on 13 September. Two days later, the government had announced plans to file an appeal. Judge Muecke's contract had been terminated after he granted the stay, which Muecke claimed was retaliation against the ruling.

In October 2018, three members of the Nauru 19, Batsiua, Squire Jeremiah, and Joram Joram, had their applications for passports denied, despite having been granted a permanent stay. Justice Muecke had explained that during the trial, there was a blacklist implemented by the government against members of the Nauru 19, to impede them in various ways, notably in employment and travel. The government denied that it was blacklisting Nauru 19 members. Some members of the Nauru 19 feared that even after the trial, they were still subject to discrimination under the blacklist. Former President Dabwido believed that this blacklist was denying him access to cancer treatment overseas. In response, he sought asylum in Australia in February 2019. The government denied delaying Dabwido's cancer treatment. By 27 March, Dabwido had arrived in Australia for treatment. Dabwido died in May 2019. Lionel Aingimea succeeded Baron Waqa as president after the election in September 2019. President Aingimea held that the Nauruan government had never interfered with the courts. Members of the Nauru 19 found blacklist restrictions to be loosened under Aingimea's administration. Squire Jeremiah was able to get a passport under the new government.

Initially, the newly formed Nauru Court of Appeals was to hear the government's appeal of the case in December 2018, but the case was delayed until 2019. In June 2019, Judge Daniel Fatiaki on the appeals court overturned both the permanent stay and the voiding of the 2018 Criminal Procedure Amendment Act. The ruling was criticized by Judge Muecke. Also in June, Nauru passed laws which effectively blocked access to international lawyers in Nauruan courts. In September, two members of the Nauru 19, Squire Jeremiah and his cousin Rutherford, had fled to Australia, seeking political asylum there. The retrial of the Nauru 19's case began on 11 November. The Nauru 19 had lost access to their Australian lawyers, and instead, one public defender represented all of 15 of them. The public defender had explained to Judge Fatiaki that it was unreasonable for him to do so. After refusing the Nauru 19 additional legal representation, there was a failed application to have Judge Fatiaki dismissed from the case for bias.

== Aftermath ==
In a verdict delivered on 11 December 2019, the remaining fifteen members of the Nauru 19 were found guilty. Only twelve of them remained in the country to receive their sentence. Eleven defendants were found guilty of rioting, but not of disturbing the legislature. Four defendants were given heavier charges of assaulting police officers. Two of these defendants were also found guilty of accessing restricted security areas. On 19 December, the Nauru 19 were ultimately sentenced by Judge Fatiaki to jail, with terms between three and eleven months. Each of them had their sentences reduced due to the delays in the trial, personal circumstances, and the extrajudicial punishment faced in the form of the blacklist. Some were also given reduced sentences due to their age, with two of the Nauru 19 being minors at the time of the offense.

By April 2020, all of the Nauru 19 had been released from prison. Batsiua had been the last one released.
