= Filimone Jitoko =

Fijian jurist and politician (born 1949)

The Honourable Filimone Jitoko

4th Speaker of the Parliament of Fiji
- Incumbent
- Assumed office 12 November 2024
- Prime Minister: Sitiveni Rabuka
- Preceded by: Naiqama Lalabalavu

10th Chief Justice of the Supreme Court of Nauru
- In office 2017–2021
- Preceded by: Joni Madraiwiwi
- Succeeded by: Daniel Fatiaki

Personal details
- Born: 3 October 1949 (age 77) Kabara, Fiji
- Spouse: Elina Senirewa Jitoko
- Children: 4
- Education: Victoria University of Wellington

Filimone Jitoko (born 3 October 1949) is a Fijian diplomat, jurist, and politician who has served as the Speaker of the Parliament of Fiji since 2024. Prior to his tenure as speaker he was the Solicitor-General of Fiji from 1993 to 1996, and Chief Justice of the Supreme Court of Nauru from 2017 to 2021.

== Early life and education ==
Filimone Jitoko was born in Kabara, Fiji, on 3 October 1949, to Isireli Rarawa and Leba Wainise. He attended District School Kabara, Ratu Kadavulevu School, and Queen Victoria School. In 1969, he was a member of a school rugby team. At the Victoria University of Wellington Jitoko graduated with a Bachelor of Laws after attending 1972 to 1976.

== Career ==
Jitoko was admitted to the bar of Fiji and New Zealand in 1978. He lectured at the University of the South Pacific. He was governor of Adi Cakobau School and president of the Fiji Cricket Association.

Jitoko worked as a State Law Office before serving as Solicitor-General of Fiji from 1993 to 1996. He was a resident magistrate and puisne judge in the High Court of Fiji. From 1985 to 1987, he was the chief registrar of the Supreme Court of Fiji. From 1988 to 1994, he was a legal advisor to the Great Council of Chiefs. From 2017 to 2021, he served as the chief justice of the Supreme Court of Nauru.

Jitoko was Fiji's ambassador to the United Kingdom, Denmark, Israel, and the Holy See. He was the counselor for Fiji's permanent representative to the United Nations and its embassy in the United States.

Naiqama Lalabalavu, the speaker of the Parliament of Fiji, was appointed as President of Fiji. On 12 November 2024, the parliament selected Jitoko to replace Lalabalavu.

== Personal life ==
Jitoko married Elina Senirewa Jitoko, with whom he has four children.

== Works cited ==
=== News ===
- Cava, Litia (2 November 2023). "Jitoko takes helm as President of Court of Appeal". Fijian Broadcasting Corporation. Archived from the original on 22 June 2025.
- Chaudhary, Felix (12 November 2024). "'Eminent, illustrious and well-respected', PM lauds new Speaker". Fijian Broadcasting Corporation. Archived from the original on 22 June 2025.

=== Web ===
- "Experienced Legal Mind Appointed to Nauru Supreme Court". Nauru. Archived from the original on 22 June 2025.
- "Hon. Speaker of the Parliament of the Republic of Fiji". Parliament of Fiji. Archived from the original on 22 June 2025.
