= Supreme Court of Nauru =

Court in Nauru

- Established: 31 January 1968
- Jurisdiction: Republic of Nauru
- Location: Yaren District, Nauru
- Composition method: Superior court of record
- Authorised by: Constitution of Nauru
- Appeals to: Nauru Court of Appeal
- Appeals from: District Court of Nauru
- Judge term length: Until age 65 (subject to constitutional provisions)
- Number of positions: Variable (currently 3)

Chief Justice
- Currently: Janmai Jay Udit
- Since: 14 January 2026

The Supreme Court of Nauru was the highest court in the judicial system of the Republic of Nauru until the establishment of the Nauruan Court of Appeal in 2018.

== Constitutional establishment ==
It was established by part V of the Constitution, adopted upon Nauru's independence from Australia in 1968. Article 48 of the Constitution establishes the Supreme Court as "a superior court of record", with jurisdiction prescribed constitutionally and by law. Art.49 stipulates that the Chief Justice is appointed by the President and sits with other justices, likewise appointed by the President, whose number is to be determined by law. Only barristers and solicitors who have been practising for at least five years may be appointed to the Supreme Court. Articles 50 and 51 prescribe that a Supreme Court judge vacates office upon attaining the age of 65 (unless that age limit be amended by legislation), or upon being removed for incapacity or misconduct by a motion adopted by at least two-thirds of members of Parliament, or upon tending their resignation to the President. Art.54 stipulates that "[t]he Supreme Court shall, to the exclusion of any other court, have original jurisdiction to determine any question arising under or involving the interpretation or effect of any provision of th[e] Constitution"; art.55 prescribes that Cabinet "may refer questions on Constitution to the Supreme Court", and that "the Supreme Court shall pronounce in open court its opinion on the question". Thus the Supreme Court is empowered to deliver an advisory opinion, albeit only upon questions referred to it by Cabinet.

== Jurisdiction ==
The Supreme Court has both original and appellate jurisdiction. The Pacific Islands Legal Information Institute notes that the Supreme Court "has unlimited original civil jurisdiction and although the Courts Act [1972] does not so specify it is assumed that it has original criminal jurisdiction". Additionally, as per the Appeals Act 1972, the Supreme Court hears appeals from the District Court in both criminal and civil cases, on questions of fact or law. The Family Court, however, functions separately, and no appeal is possible from this court to the Supreme Court.

Despite its name, the Supreme Court is not the highest court of appeal in most cases. Its judgements on constitutional matters are final, but any other case may be appealed further to the Appellate Court. In addition, art.57 of the Constitution stipulates that "Parliament may provide that an appeal lies as prescribed by law from a judgment, decree, order or sentence of the Supreme Court to a court of another country". This provision was implemented in an agreement between Nauru and Australia in 1976, providing for appeals from the Supreme Court of Nauru to the High Court of Australia in both criminal and civil cases, with certain exceptions; in particular, no case pertaining to the Constitution of Nauru may be decided by the Australian court.

This appellate jurisdiction concluded on 12 March 2018 after the Government of Nauru unilaterally ended the arrangement, which had previously been advocated by the Australian Law Reform Commission) and others as sitting awkwardly with the High Court of Australia's other responsibilities. In a speech to parliament on the occasion of the 50th anniversary of Nauru's independence, President Baron Waqa stated: "Severance of ties to Australia's highest court is a logical step towards full nationhood and an expression of confidence in Nauru's ability to determine its own destiny." Nauruan Justice Minister David Adeang cited the cost of appeals to the High Court as another reason for Nauru to establish its own Court of Appeal as the country's highest court. The termination of the agreement required 90 days notice, which Nauru gave on 12 December 2017, but did not become known until after the Supreme Court had reheard a case relating to a 2015 protest outside the Nauruan parliament that was remitted to it "for hearing according to law" by the High Court after quashing the original decision. The reheard case again imposed increased sentences on the defendants who, with the new Court of Appeals not yet established, have been left with no avenue of appeal, a situation that has been criticised as deeply unfair. The Nauru Court of Appeal Act was passed in 2018 and commenced in 2020. However, due to the coronavirus pandemic, the judicial positions of the Court of Appeal were not filled till mid-2022 when the first hearings began.

As Nauruan law is derived from the English and Australian common law system, precedents set by the Supreme Court are integrated to national law, and the Supreme Court's interpretation of the law binds lower courts. Such precedents are, however, superseded by statute law.

== Cases ==
The Supreme Court heard its first case, Detamaigo v Demaure, in April 1969. The case consisted in an "appeal against a decision of the Nauru Lands Committee as to the persons beneficially entitled to the personality of the estate of a deceased Nauruan". In a very brief ruling, Chief Justice Thompson struck out the appeal, on the grounds that "this Court has no jurisdiction to entertain appeals from the Nauru Lands Committee's determinations in respect of personalty", as such jurisdiction was not specifically provided by the Nauru Lands Committee Ordinance 1956.

The first constitutional case to reach the Supreme Court was Jeremiah v Nauru Local Government Council, decided in March 1971, on petition to the Supreme Court. The petitioner, Jeremiah, was a Nauruan man who wished to marry a non-Nauruan woman. The Nauru Local Government Council, whose consent was required for any lawful marriage between a Nauruan and a non-Nauruan (as per the Births, Deaths and Marriages Ordinance 1957), refused to grant consent, without providing a reason. Jeremiah argued this was a violation of article 3 of the Constitution, which provides that "every person in Nauru is entitled to the fundamental rights and freedoms of the individual". Chief Justice Thompson, however, ruled that the constitutional meaning of "fundamental rights and freedoms of the individual" was to be restricted to the rights and freedoms explicitly established by the Constitution. Thus, no constitutional right to marry existed.

In October 2010, the Supreme Court ruled on its most recent constitutional case, In the Matter of the Constitution and in the Matter of the Dissolution of the Eighteenth Parliament, to determine whether the dissolution of a deadlocked Parliament and the ensuing proclamation of a state of emergency by President Marcus Stephen were constitutionally valid. The case had been brought by members of the parliamentary Opposition. Justice John von Doussa ruled in favour of the President, stating that art.77 of the Constitution gave the President full latitude to determine whether a state of emergency should be declared.

The current Chief Justice is Filimone Jitoko, he succeeded Ratu Joni Madraiwiwi in 2017. Justice Crulci (2014–2017) and Resident Magistrate Emma Garo (2014-2016) were the first women to be appointed to the judiciary in Nauru.

== Judges ==
Current members of the Supreme Court of Nauru are:

- Janmai Jay Udit — Chief Justice (appointed 14 January 2026)
- Mohammed Shafiullah Khan — Justice (appointed 2 August 2014)
- Kiniviliame Keteca — Justice (appointed September 2023)

== List of chief justices ==
| Name | Took office | Left office |
|---|---|---|
| Ronald Knox-Mawer | 1968 | 1970 |
| Ian William Thompson | 1970 | 1983 |
| Francis Lenton Daly | 1983 | 1984 |
| H. Gilbert | 1984 | 1984 |
| B. J. McK. Kerr (acting) | 1984 | 1985 |
| Sir Gaven Donne KBE | 1985 | 2001 |
| Barry Connell | 2001 | 2006 |
| Robin Millhouse QC | 2006 | 2010 |
| Geoffrey Eames AM QC | 2010 | 2014 |
| Joni Madraiwiwi | 2014 | 2016 |
| Filimone Jitoko | 2017 | 2021 |
| Daniel Fatiaki | 2021 | 2026 |
| Janmai Jay Udit | 2026 | incumbent |

== See also ==
- Constitution of Nauru
- Law of Nauru
- Chief Justice of Nauru
