= Geoffrey Eames =

Australian jurist

Geoffrey Michael Eames AM, KC (born 26 November 1945) is an Australian jurist, who was a judge of the Supreme Court of Victoria. He served in the trial division of the Court from 1992 to 2002, and was then a member of the Court of Appeal until 2007. He subsequently served as an Acting Judge of the Supreme Court of the Northern Territory, and as Chief Justice of Nauru.

== Early life ==
Eames was born in Melbourne in 1945. He was educated at St. Bernard's College in Essendon, then studied law at the University of Melbourne, graduating with a Bachelor of Laws.

== Career ==
Eames did articles at the firm of Slater and Gordon, and was admitted to the Victorian Bar in 1969. In the 1970s he joined the Central Australian Legal Service as its principal Solicitor, and was then seconded to the Central Land Council in Alice Springs where he pioneered all early land claims made under the Aboriginal Land Rights Act, Northern Territory, 1976 and the passage of the legislation itself, before heading to the bar in Darwin.

In 1980, he was admitted to the bar in South Australia, joining the independent bar in 1984. Eames was a member of Hanson Chambers from 1987 to 1991, and took silk as a Queen's Counsel in South Australia in 1989 and in Victoria in 1990. During this time he worked as a barrister in two Royal Commissions: the McClelland Royal Commission (1985) into British nuclear testing in Australia, and the Royal Commission into Aboriginal Deaths in Custody (1987–1991).

=== Supreme Court of Victoria ===
On 26 May 1992, Eames was appointed as a judge of the Supreme Court of Victoria. On 15 March 2002 he was appointed a judge of the Court of Appeal and served until 2007.

=== Supreme Court of the Northern Territory ===
Eames was appointed as an Acting Judge of the Supreme Court of the Northern Territory between 2007 and 2009.

=== Supreme Court of Nauru ===
In December 2010, Eames was appointed Chief Justice of the two-member Supreme Court of Nauru. In January 2014, the Chief Magistrate of Nauru, Peter Law, issued an injunction to prevent the deportation of three foreign nationals. Law was fired by Nauru President Baron Waqa and himself deported. Eames, in Australia at the time, issued an injunction to prevent the deportation of Law, however Law was deported. The Nauru government cancelled Eames' visa which prevented his return to Nauru, and he resigned two months later. The incidents involving Law and Eames were criticised by Mathew Batsiua a member of Nauru's Opposition and precipitated a government crackdown on opposition.

== Publications ==
Eames, Geoff; Rubuntja, Wenten; Society of Labor Lawyers (Victoria) (1976), Land rights or a sell out? : an analysis of the Aboriginal land rights (Northern Territory) bill, 1976, [Melbourne] Victorian Fabian Society and Society of Labor Lawyers (Victoria) by arrangement with the Central Australian Land Rights Bulletin, ISBN 978-0909953126

Legal offices
Preceded by Robin Millhouse	Chief Justice of Nauru; 2010–2014	Succeeded by Joni Madraiwiwi
