= Nauru =

Island country in Oceania

Republic of Naoero Repubrikin Naoero (Nauruan)
- Flag Coat of arms
- Motto: "God's will first"
- Anthem: Nauru Bwiema (Nauruan) "Nauru, Our Homeland"
- Capital: Yaren (de facto) (Note: Nauru does not have an official capital, but Yaren is the seat of parliament.); 0°32′51″S 166°55′3″E
- Largest city: Denigomodu
- Official languages: Nauruan; English (Note: English is widely spoken by the majority of the population and it is commonly used in government, legislation and commerce alongside Nauruan. Because of Nauru's history and relationship with Australia, Australian English is the dominant variety.)
- Demonyms: Nauruan; dei-Naoero (official)
- Government: Unitary parliamentary republic with an executive presidency under a non-partisan democracy
  - President: David Adeang
  - Vice President: Lionel Aingimea
  - Speaker of the Parliament: Marcus Stephen
- Legislature: Parliament

Independence from Australia
  - Nauru Independence Act 1967: 31 January 1968

Area
  - Total: 21 km^{2} (8.1 sq mi) (193rd)
  - Water (%): 0.57

Population
  - 2025 estimate: 12,025
  - 2021 census: 11,680 (193rd)
  - Density: 480/km^{2} (1,243.2/sq mi) (20th)
- GDP (PPP): 2025 estimate
  - Total: $132 million (192nd)
  - Per capita: $10,962 (119th)
- GDP (nominal): 2025 estimate
  - Total: $172 million (195th)
  - Per capita: $14,274 (75th)
- HDI (2023): ▲0.703 high (124th)
- Currency: Australian dollar (AUD)
- Time zone: UTC+12
- Calling code: +674
- ISO 3166 code: NR
- Internet TLD: .nr

Nauru (Note: /nɑːˈuːruː/ nah-OO-roo or /ˈnaʊruː/ NOW-roo; Nauruan: Naoero [ˈnao̯ɛro].), also known by its native name Naoero and officially as the Republic of Naoero, (Note: /ˈnaʊɛəroʊ/ NOW-air-oh, Nauruan: Repubrikin Naoero) is an island country in Oceania, in the South Pacific Ocean. It lies within the Micronesia region; its nearest neighbour, about 300 kilometres (190 mi) to the east, is Banaba, part of Kiribati. Yaren is its de facto capital.

With an area of 21 square kilometres (8.1 mi^{2}; 2,100 ha; 5,200 acres), Nauru is the third-smallest country in the world, as well as the smallest member state of the Commonwealth of Nations by both area and population. Its population of about 12,000 is the world's third-smallest (not including colonies or overseas territories). Nauru is a member of the United Nations, the Commonwealth of Nations, and the Organisation of African, Caribbean and Pacific States.

First settled by Micronesians circa 1000 BCE, Nauru was annexed and claimed as a colony by the German Empire in the late 19th century. It was occupied by Australia during World War I and subsequently became a League of Nations mandate administered by Australia with New Zealand and the United Kingdom as co-trustees. Nauru was occupied by Japan for three years during World War II and became a United Nations trust territory after the war. Nauru gained its independence from Australia in 1968. At various points since 2001, it has accepted aid from Australia in exchange for hosting the Nauru Regional Processing Centre, a controversial offshore Australian immigration detention facility. As a result of heavy dependence on Australia, some sources have identified Nauru as an Australian client state.

Nauru is a phosphate-rock island with rich deposits near the surface, as a result of which most of its interior was profitably but destructively strip-mined for about a century starting in 1900. The island's viable phosphate reserves were exhausted in the 1990s and, in a classic example of the resource curse, mismanagement of the island's accumulated mining wealth resulted in serious financial troubles through the 2000s; the economy gradually recovered in the 2010s.

== Name and etymology ==
Nauru's name in the Nauruan language is Naoero. The etymology is uncertain. German ethnologist Paul Hambruch speculates that Nauru was a contraction of a Nauruan phrase a-nuau-a-a-ororo, supposedly meaning "I go to the beach". Hambruch's theory is included in the Deutsches Kolonial-Lexikon of 1920, but linguist Alois Kayser later stated that this sentence was ungrammatical in Nauruan and an example of a folk etymology.

Early spellings used during the colonial period included Naura, Nauru, Nawodo and Onawero. When a German protectorate was proclaimed in 1888, Nauru was adopted as the official name in the Reichskommissar's report, subsequently becoming the standard spelling in both English and German. The island had previously been known in English as Pleasant Island. On independence in 1968, the Constitution of Nauru designated "Republic of Nauru" as the official English name. In May 2026, a constitutional amendment was passed to change the official English name to "Republic of Naoero", matching the spelling in the Nauruan language. On 26 June 2026, Nauru informed the United Nations that it had changed its official name to the Republic of Naoero.

== History ==
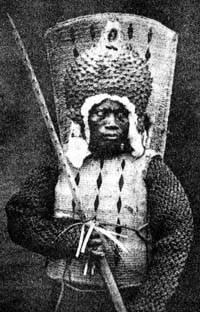
Nauruan warrior during the Nauruan Civil War c. 1880

Nauru was first settled by Micronesians at least 3,000 years ago, and there is evidence of possible Polynesian influence. Comparatively little is known of Nauruan prehistory, although the island is believed to have had a long period of isolation, which accounts for the distinct language that developed. There were traditionally twelve clans or tribes on Nauru, which are represented in the twelve-pointed star on the country's flag. Traditionally, Nauruans traced their descent matrilineally. Inhabitants practised aquaculture: they caught juvenile milkfish (known as ibija in Nauruan), acclimatised them to freshwater, and raised them in Buada Lagoon, providing a reliable food source. The other locally grown components of their diet included coconuts and pandanus fruit.

In 1798, the British sea captain John Fearn, on his trading ship Hunter, became the first Westerner to report sighting Nauru, calling it "Pleasant Island" because of its attractive appearance. From at least 1826, Nauruans had regular contact with Europeans on whaling and trading ships who called for provisions and fresh drinking water. The last whaler to call during the Age of Sail visited in 1904. Around this time, deserters from European ships began to live on the island. The islanders traded food for alcoholic palm wine and firearms. The firearms were used during the 10-year Nauruan Civil War that began in 1878.

After an agreement with Great Britain, Germany annexed Nauru in 1888 and incorporated it into the Marshall Islands Protectorate for administrative purposes. The arrival of the Germans ended the civil war, and kings were established as rulers of the island. King Auweyida was the most widely known. Christian missionaries from the Gilbert Islands arrived in 1888. The Germans ruled Nauru for almost three decades. Robert Rasch, a German trader who married a 15-year-old Nauruan girl, was the first administrator, appointed in 1890.

In 1900, phosphate was discovered on Nauru by prospector Albert Fuller Ellis. The Pacific Phosphate Company began to exploit the reserves in 1906 by agreement with Germany, exporting its first shipment in 1907. In 1914, following the outbreak of World War I, Nauru was captured and occupied by Australian troops. The Treaty of Versailles placed Nauru under a League of Nations mandate personally granted to King George V. The Nauru Island Agreement was signed in 1919 between Australia, New Zealand and the United Kingdom, providing for the continued administration of the island by Australia and extraction of the phosphate deposits by an intergovernmental British Phosphate Commission (BPC). The terms of the League of Nations mandate were drawn up in 1920.

The island experienced an influenza epidemic and ongoing colonial strife through the early 20th century, with a mortality rate of 18 per cent among native Nauruans. In 1923, the League of Nations gave Australia a trustee mandate over Nauru, with the United Kingdom and New Zealand as co-trustees. On 6 and 7 December 1940, the German auxiliary cruisers Komet and Orion sank five supply ships in the vicinity of Nauru. Komet then shelled Nauru's phosphate mining areas, oil storage depots, and the shiploading cantilever.

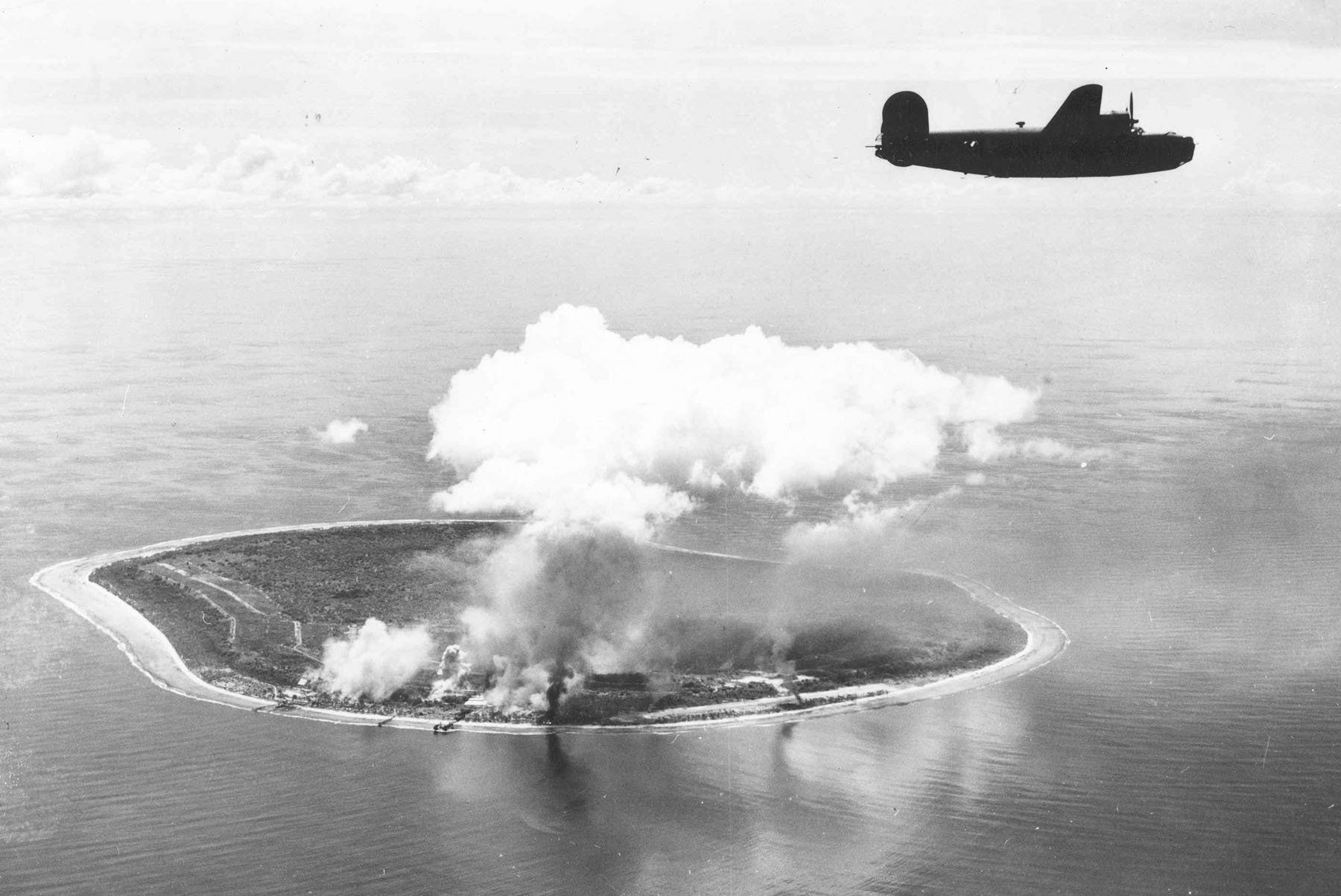
U.S. Army Air Forces bombing the Japanese airstrip on Nauru (1943).

Japanese troops occupied Nauru on 25 August 1942. The Japanese built two airfields which were bombed for the first time on 25 March 1943, preventing food supplies from being flown to Nauru. The Japanese deported 1,200 Nauruans to work as labourers in the Chuuk Islands, which were also occupied by Japan. Nauru was finally taken back from the Japanese on 13 September 1945, when commander Hisayaki Soeda surrendered the island to the Australian Army and the Royal Australian Navy. The surrender was accepted by Brigadier J. R. Stevenson, who represented Lieutenant General Vernon Sturdee, the commander of the First Australian Army, aboard the warship HMAS Diamantina. Arrangements were made to repatriate from Chuuk the 745 Nauruans who survived Japanese captivity there. They were returned to Nauru by the BPC ship Trienza in January 1946.

In 1947, a trusteeship was established by the United Nations, with Australia, New Zealand, and the United Kingdom as trustees. Under those arrangements, the UK, Australia, and New Zealand were a joint administering authority. The Nauru Island Agreement provided for the first administrator to be appointed by Australia for five years, leaving subsequent appointments to be decided by the three governments. In practice, administrative power was exercised by Australia alone.

The 1948 Nauru riots occurred when Chinese mining workers went on strike over pay and conditions. The Australian administration imposed a state of emergency with Native Police and armed volunteers of locals and Australian officials being mobilised. This force, using sub-machine guns and other firearms, opened fire on the Chinese workers, killing two and wounding sixteen. About 50 of the workers were arrested; two of them were bayoneted to death while in custody. The trooper who bayoneted the prisoners was charged but acquitted on grounds that the wounds were "accidentally received." The governments of the Soviet Union and China made official complaints against Australia at the United Nations over this incident.

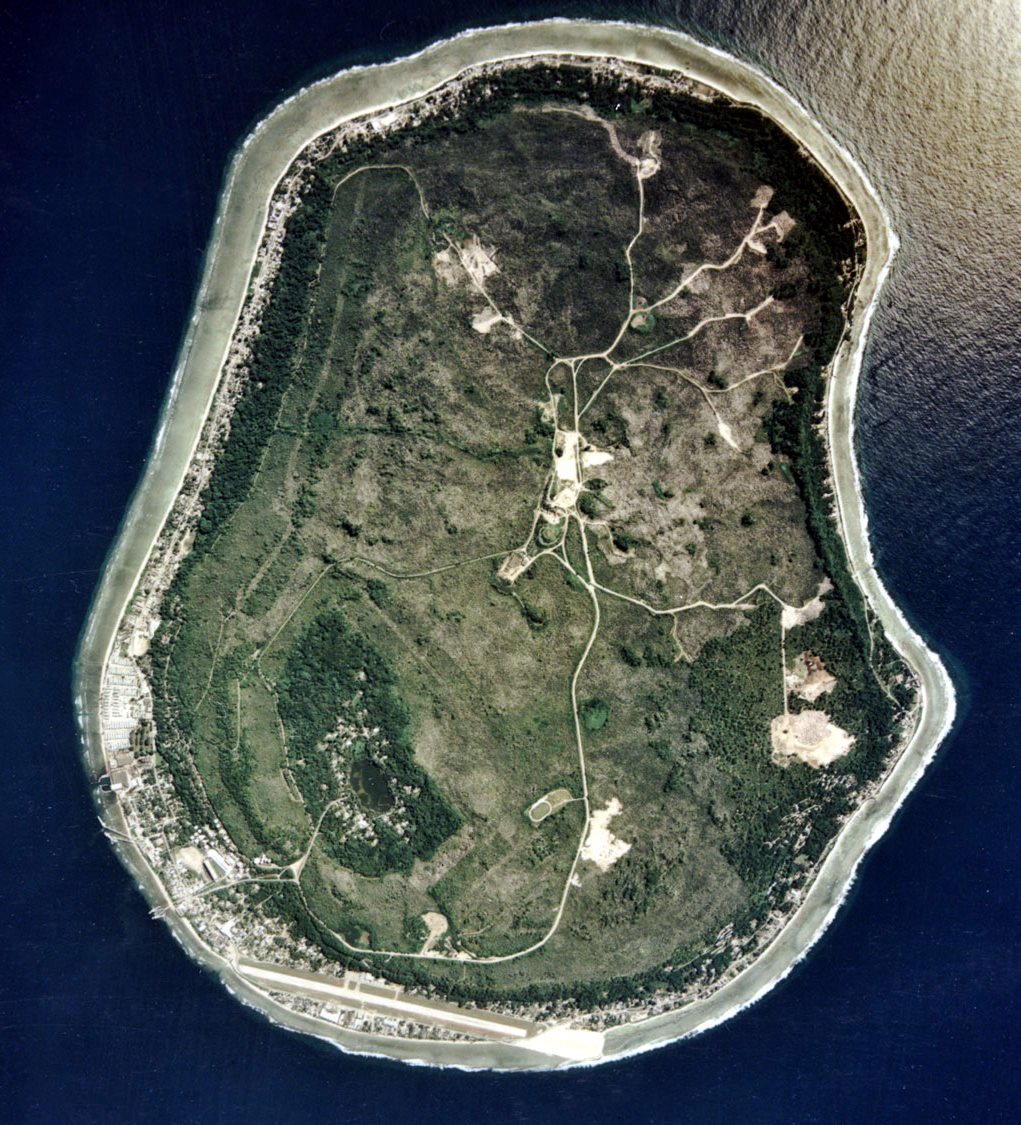
Satellite image of Nauru (2002)

In 1964, it was proposed to relocate the population of Nauru to Curtis Island off the coast of Queensland, Australia. By that time, Nauru had been extensively mined for phosphate by companies from Australia, Britain, and New Zealand, damaging the landscape so much that it was thought the island would be uninhabitable by the 1990s. Rehabilitating the island was seen as financially impossible. In 1962, Australian Prime Minister Robert Menzies said that the three countries involved in the mining had an obligation to provide a solution for the Nauruan people and proposed finding a new island for them. In 1963, the Australian government proposed to acquire all the land on Curtis Island (which was considerably larger than Nauru) and then offer the Nauruans freehold title over the island and that the Nauruans would become Australian citizens. The cost of resettling the Nauruans on Curtis Island was estimated to be £10 million (A$649 million in 2022), which included housing and infrastructure and the establishment of pastoral, agricultural, and fishing industries. However, the Nauruan people did not wish to become Australian citizens and wanted to be given sovereignty over Curtis Island to establish themselves as an independent state; Australia would not agree. The Nauruans chose instead to become a sovereign state operating its own mines on Nauru.

In January 1966, Nauru became self-governing. Following negotiations with the Australian government, the parliament of Australia passed the Nauru Independence Act 1967 allowing for Nauru's independence on 31 January 1968, after a constitutional convention and proclamation of the constitution of Nauru. Independence leader Hammer DeRoburt was subsequently elected as the inaugural president. In 1967, the government of Nauru purchased the assets of the BPC, and in June 1970 control passed to the locally owned Nauru Phosphate Corporation. Income from the mines made Nauruans among the richest people in the world. In 1989, Nauru took legal action against Australia in the International Court of Justice over Australia's administration of the island, particularly Australia's failure to remedy the environmental damage caused by phosphate mining. Certain Phosphate Lands: Nauru v. Australia led to an out-of-court settlement to rehabilitate the mined-out areas of Nauru.

== Geography ==
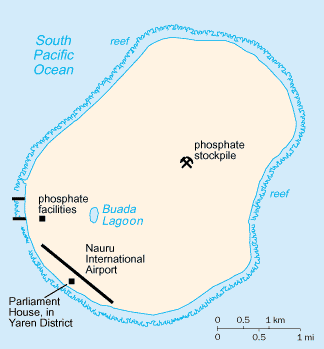
Map of Nauru

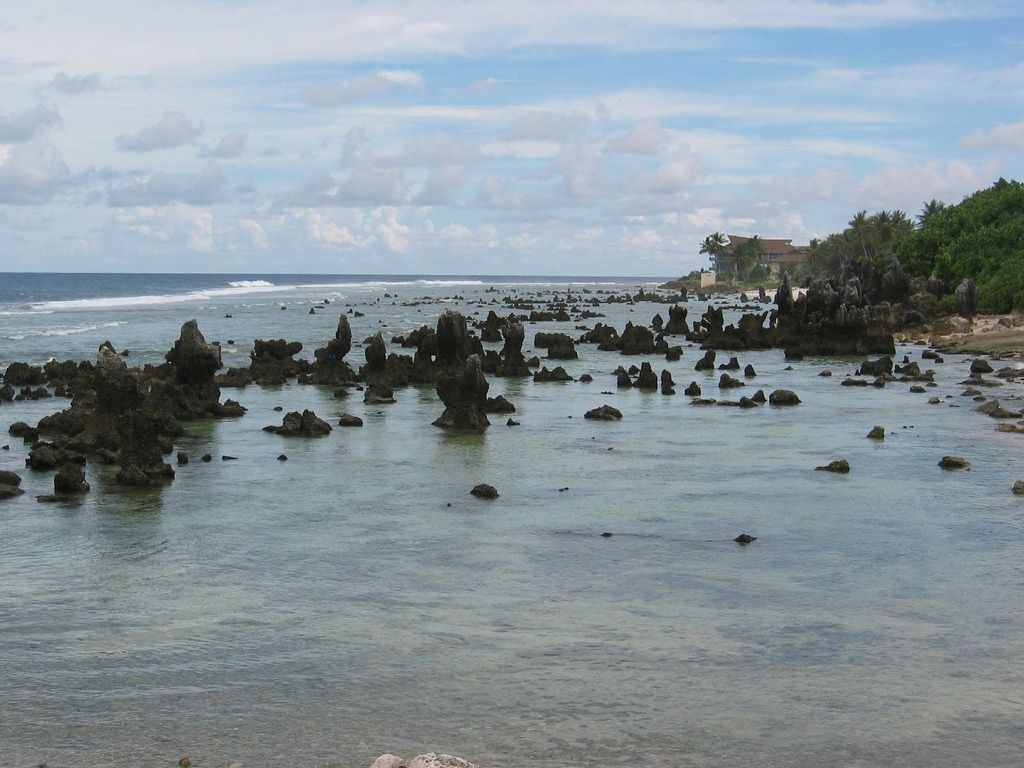
Coastal beach area of Nauru, with its distinctive coral pillars

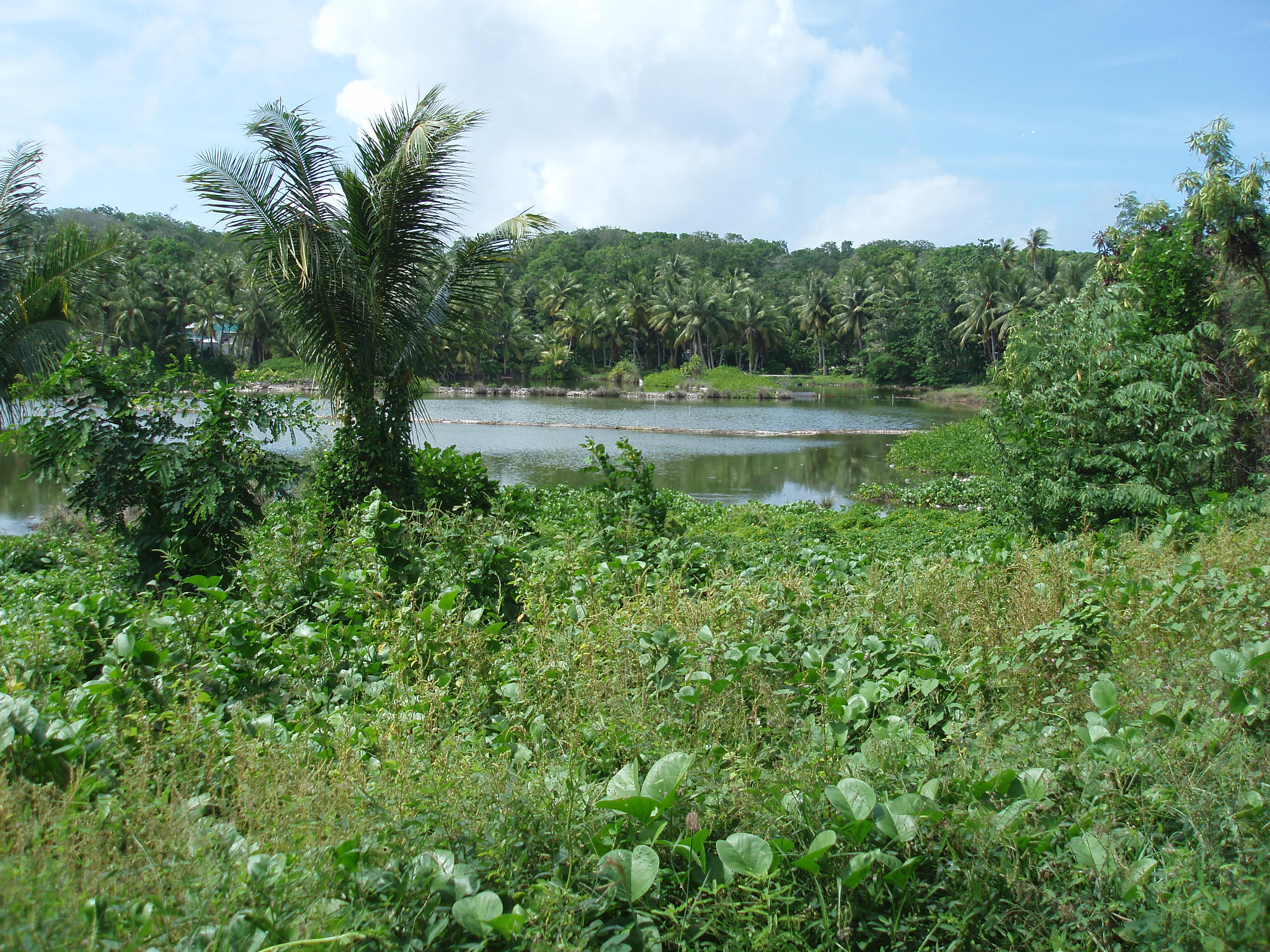
Buada Lagoon

Nauru is a 21 km^{2} (8.1 sq mi), oval-shaped island in the southwestern Pacific Ocean. The island is surrounded by a fringing coral reef, which is exposed at low tide and dotted with pinnacles. The presence of the reef has prevented the establishment of a seaport, although channels in the reef allow small boats access to the island. A fertile coastal strip 150 to 300 m (490 to 980 ft) wide lies inland from the beach. Coral cliffs surround a central plateau. The highest point of the plateau, Command Ridge, is 71 m (233 ft) above sea level.

The only fertile areas on the narrow coastal belt, where coconut palms flourish. The land around Buada Lagoon supports bananas, pineapples, vegetables, pandanus trees, and indigenous hardwoods, such as the tamanu tree.

Nauru was one of three great phosphate rock islands in the Pacific Ocean, along with Banaba and Makatea. The phosphate reserves on Nauru are now almost entirely depleted. Phosphate mining in the central plateau has left a barren terrain of jagged limestone pinnacles up to 15 m (49 ft) high. Mining has stripped and devastated about 80 per cent of Nauru's land area, leaving it uninhabitable, and has also affected the surrounding exclusive economic zone; Forty per cent of marine life is estimated to have been killed by silt and phosphate runoff.

The island has no rivers.

=== Climate ===
Nauru's climate is hot and very humid year-round because of its proximity to the equator and the ocean. Nauru is hit by monsoon rains between November and February. Annual rainfall is highly variable and is influenced by the El Niño–Southern Oscillation, with several significant recorded droughts. The temperature ranges between 30 and 35 °C (86 and 95 °F) during the day and is stable at about 25 °C (77 °F) at night.

Streams do not exist in Nauru. Water is gathered from roof catchment systems or brought to Nauru as ballast on ships returning for loads of phosphate.

=== Ecology ===
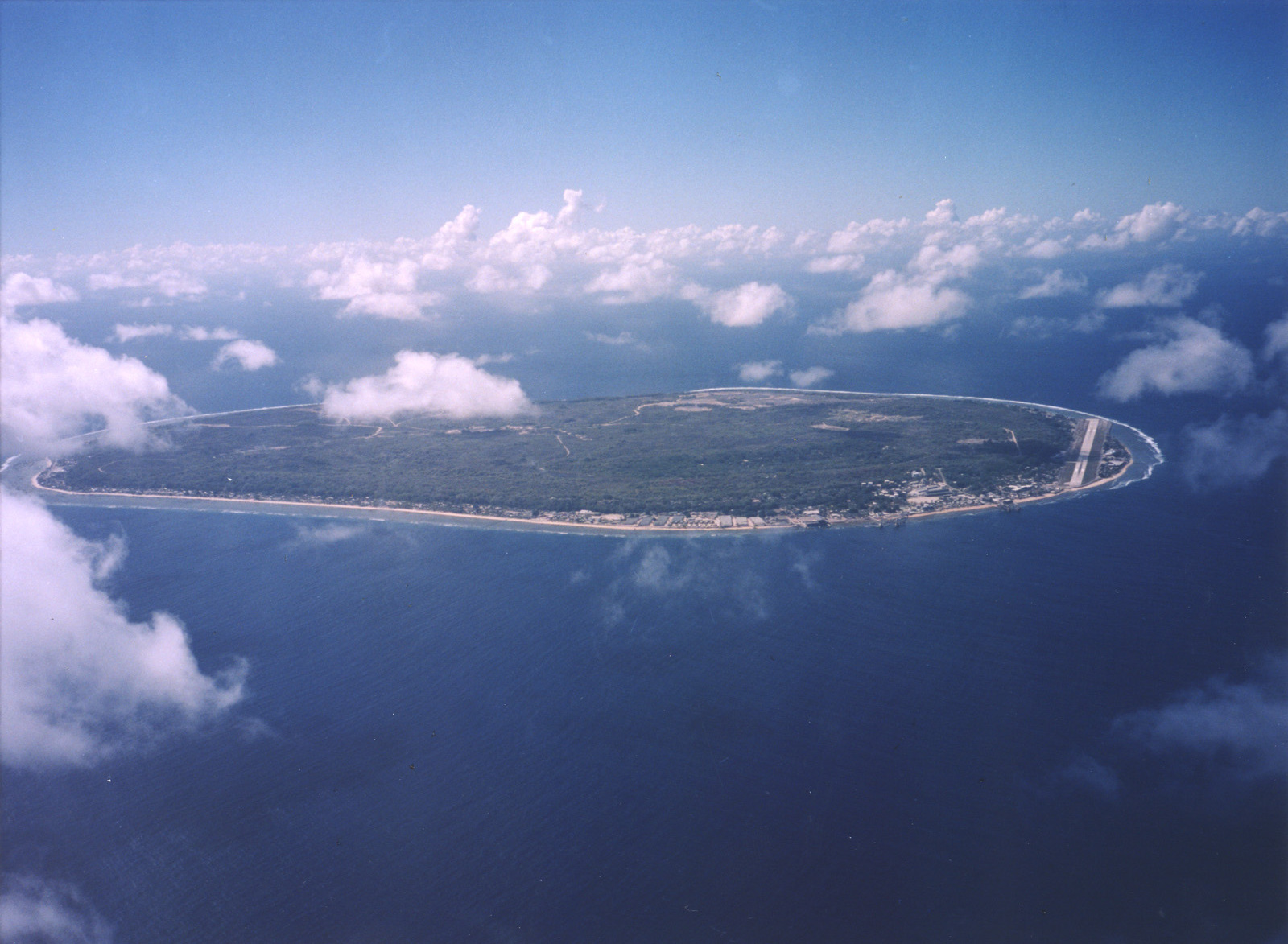
Aerial view of Nauru

Fauna is sparse because of lack of vegetation and the consequences of phosphate mining. Many indigenous birds have disappeared or become rare owing to the destruction of their habitat. There are about 60 recorded vascular plant species native to the island, none of which are endemic. Coconut farming, mining, and introduced species have seriously disturbed the native vegetation.

Although it has no native land mammals, Nauru does have native insects, land crabs, and birds, including the endemic Nauru reed warbler. The Polynesian rat, cats, dogs, pigs, and chickens have been introduced to Nauru from ships.

== Politics ==
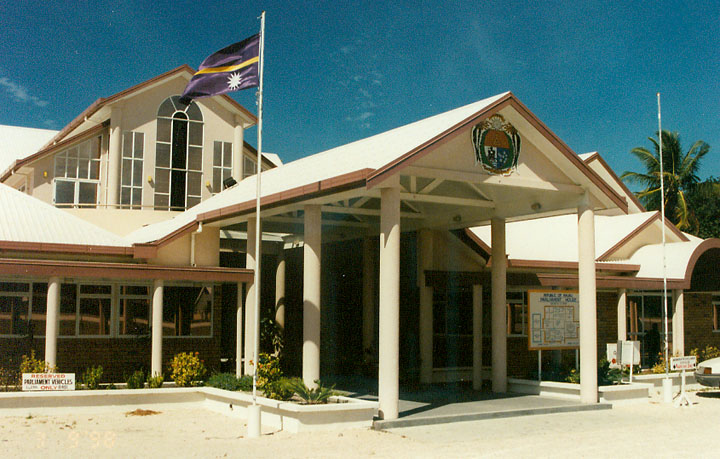
Parliament of Nauru

The president of Nauru is David Adeang, who heads a 19-member unicameral parliament. The country is a member of the United Nations, the Commonwealth of Nations, and the Asian Development Bank. Nauru also participates in the Commonwealth and Olympic Games. Recently, Nauru became a member country of the International Renewable Energy Agency and a member of the International Monetary Fund.

Nauru is a republic with a parliamentary system of government. The president is both head of state and head of government and is dependent on parliamentary confidence to remain president. All 19 parliament seats are elected every three years. The parliament elects the president from its members, and the president appoints a cabinet of five to six members. As a result of a referendum in 2021, naturalised citizens and their descendants are barred from becoming parliamentarians.

Nauru lacks any formal structure for political parties, and candidates typically stand for office as independents; 15 of the 19 members of the current parliament are independents. The four current parties are the Nauru Party, the Democratic Party, the Nauru First party, and the Centre Party. Alliances within the government are often formed, however, based on extended family ties rather than party affiliation.

From 1992 to 1999, Nauru had a local government system known as the Nauru Island Council (NIC). It was a successor to the Nauru Local Government Council, established in 1951. This nine-member council was designed to provide municipal services. The NIC was dissolved in 1999, and all assets and liabilities became vested in the national government. Land tenure is unusual: all Nauruans have certain rights to all land on the island, which is owned by individuals and family groups. Government and corporate entities do not own any land, and they must enter into a lease arrangement with landowners to use land. Non-Nauruans cannot own land.

The Supreme Court of Nauru is paramount on constitutional issues. Other cases can be appealed to the two-judge Nauru Court of Appeal. Parliament cannot overturn court decisions. Historically, appellate court rulings could be appealed to the High Court of Australia, though this happened only rarely and the Australian court's appellate jurisdiction ended entirely in 2018 after Nauru unilaterally ended the arrangement. Lower courts consist of the District Court and the Family Court, both of which are headed by a resident magistrate, who also is the registrar of the Supreme Court. There are two other quasi-courts: the Public Service Appeal Board and the Police Appeal Board, both of which are presided over by the chief justice.

=== Foreign relations ===
Following independence in 1968, Nauru joined the Commonwealth of Nations as a Special Member; it became a full member in 1999. The country was admitted to the Asian Development Bank in 1991 and the United Nations in 1999. Nauru is a member of the South Pacific Regional Environment Programme, the Pacific Community, and the South Pacific Applied Geoscience Commission. In February 2021, Nauru announced it would be formally withdrawing from the Pacific Islands Forum in a joint statement with Marshall Islands, Kiribati, and the Federated States of Micronesia after a dispute regarding Henry Puna's election as the forum's secretary-general.

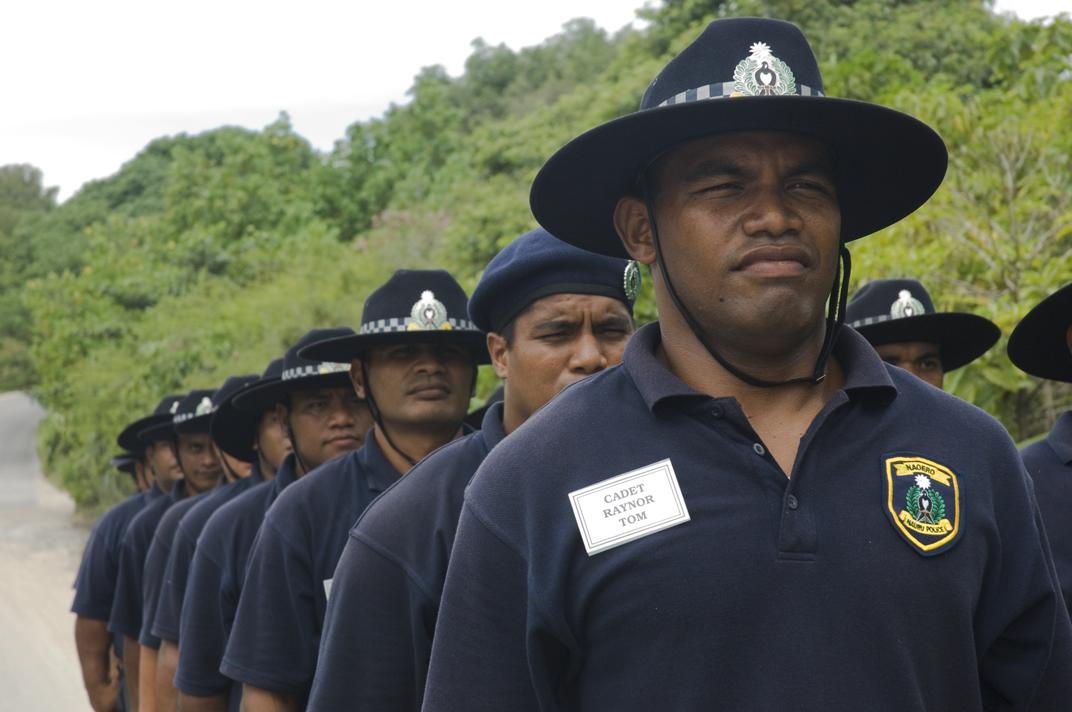
Nauruan police cadets undergoing training. Nauru has no armed forces, although it does have a small police force under civilian control.

Nauru has no armed forces; the Nauru Police Force operates under civilian control. Australia is responsible for Nauru's defence under an informal agreement between the two countries. The September 2005 memorandum of understanding between Australia and Nauru provides the latter with financial aid and technical assistance, including a secretary of finance to prepare the budget and advisers on health and education. This aid is in return for Nauru's housing of asylum seekers while their applications for entry into Australia are processed. Nauru uses the Australian dollar as its official currency.

Nauru has used its position as a member of the United Nations to gain financial support from both Taiwan (ROC) and China (PRC) by changing its recognition from one to the other under the One-China policy. In 2002, Nauru signed an agreement to establish diplomatic relations with the PRC, accepting US$130 million from the PRC for this action (US$222 million in 2025). In response, the ROC severed diplomatic relations with Nauru. Nauru re-established links with the ROC in 2005, and diplomatic ties with the PRC were officially severed. On 15 January 2024, Nauru severed ties with the ROC and re-established diplomatic ties with the PRC.

In 2008, Nauru recognised Kosovo as an independent country, and in 2009 Nauru recognised Abkhazia and South Ossetia, two breakaway autonomous republics of Georgia. Russia was reported to be giving Nauru US$50 million in humanitarian aid as a result of this recognition (US$73.3 million in 2025). In 2008, the Nauruan government announced a port refurbishment programme, financed with US$9 million of development aid received from Russia (US$13.2 million in 2025). The Nauru government claimed this aid is not related to its recognition of Abkhazia and South Ossetia. On 30 July 2026, however, the government withdrew its recognition of Abkhazia and South Ossetia.

The US Atmospheric Radiation Measurement program operates a climate-monitoring facility on the island.

A significant portion of Nauru's income has been in the form of aid from Australia. In 2001, the MV Tampa, a Norwegian ship that had rescued 438 refugees from a stranded boat, was seeking to dock in Australia. In what became known as the Tampa affair, the ship was refused entry and boarded by Australian troops. The refugees were eventually taken to Nauru to be held in detention facilities which later became part of the Howard government's Pacific Solution. Nauru operated two detention centres known as State House and Topside for these refugees in exchange for Australian aid. By 2005, only two refugees remained on Nauru from those first sent there in 2001. The Australian government sent more groups of asylum-seekers to Nauru in late 2006 and early 2007. The refugee centre was closed in 2008 but was re-opened in 2012. Amnesty International has since described the conditions of the refugees of war living in Nauru as a "horror", with reports of children as young as eight attempting suicide and engaging in acts of self-harm. In 2018, the situation gained attention as a "mental health crisis", with an estimated thirty children suffering from traumatic withdrawal syndrome, also known as resignation syndrome. A few dozen refugees were being held there as of 2024.

=== Administrative divisions ===
Map of Nauru showing its districts

Nauru is divided into fourteen administrative districts, which are grouped into eight electoral constituencies and are further divided into villages. The most populous district is Denigomodu, with 1,874 residents, of which 1,526 reside in a Republic of Nauru Phosphate Corporation settlement called "Location". The following table shows population by district according to the 2021 census.

No.	District	Former name	Area (ha)	Population (2021)	No. of villages	Density (persons/ha)
1	Aiwo	Aiue	110	1,258	8	11.4
2	Anabar	Anebwor	150	565	15	3.8
3	Anetan	Añetañ	100	795	12	7.9
4	Anibare	Anybody	310	373	17	1.2
5	Baitsi	Beidi, Baiti	120	523	15	4.4
6	Boe	Boi	50	845	4	16.9
7	Buada	Arenibok	260	969	14	3.7
8	Denigomodu	Denikomotu	118	1,874	17	15.9
9	Ewa	Eoa	120	537	12	4.5
10	Ijuw	Ijub	110	276	13	2.5
11	Meneng	Meneñ	310	1,797	18	5.8
12	Nibok	Ennibeck	160	724	11	4.5
13	Uaboe	Ueboi	80	341	6	4.3
14	Yaren	Moqua	150	803	7	5.4
–	Nauru	Pleasant Island	2,120	11,680	169	5.5

== Economy ==
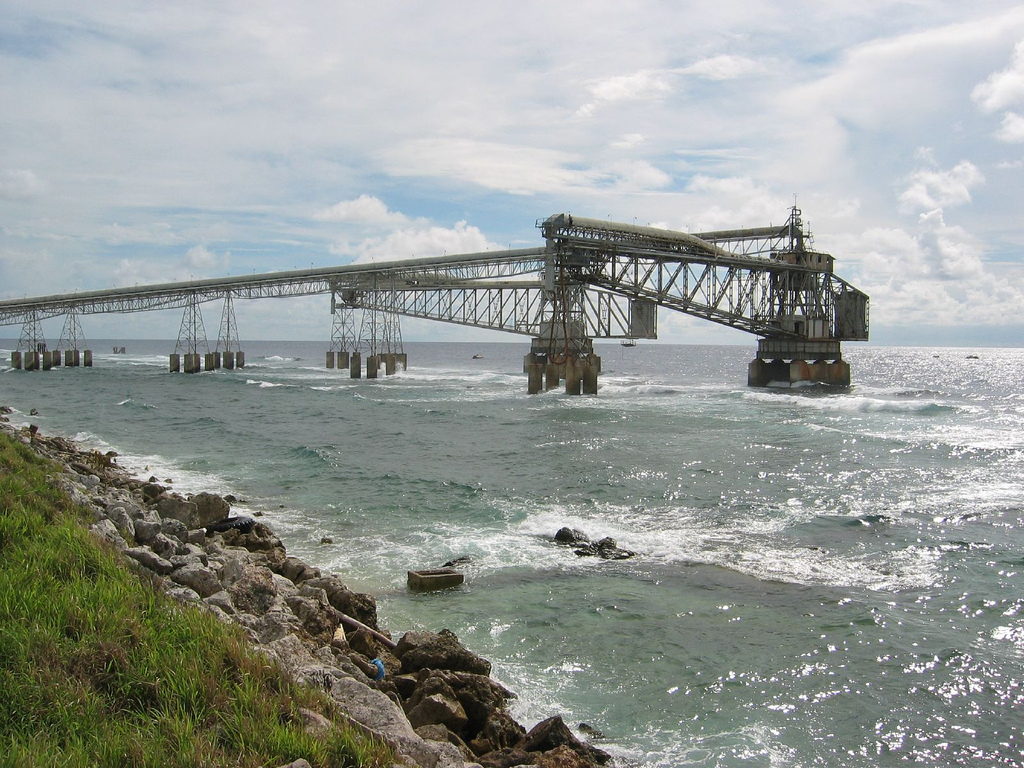
Phosphate loading infrastructure

Before a resurgence in the 2010s, the economy was strongest in the 1970s, with GDP peaking in 1981. This trend came from phosphate mining, which accounted for a majority of its economic output. Mining declined starting in the early 1980s. There are few other resources, and most necessities are imported. Small-scale mining is still conducted by RONPhos, formerly known as the Nauru Phosphate Corporation. The government places a percentage of RONPhos's earnings into the Nauru Phosphate Royalties Trust. The trust manages long-term investments, which were intended to support the citizens after the phosphate reserves were exhausted.

Because of mismanagement, the trust's fixed and current assets were reduced considerably and may never fully recover. The failed investments included financing Leonardo the Musical in 1993. The Mercure Hotel in Sydney and Nauru House in Melbourne were sold in 2004 to finance debts, and Air Nauru's only Boeing 737 was repossessed in 2005. Normal air service resumed after the aircraft was replaced with a Boeing 737-300 airliner in 2006. In 2005, the corporation sold its remaining real estate in Melbourne, the vacant Savoy Tavern site, for A$7.5 million (US$11.9 million in 2025).

The value of the trust is estimated to have shrunk from A$1.3 billion in 1991 to A$138 million in 2002 (A$2.79 billion to A$229 million in 2022 dollars). Through the 2000s, Nauru lacked money to perform many of the basic functions of government; for example, the National Bank of Nauru became insolvent and was closed in 2006. The CIA World Factbook estimated a GDP per capita of US$5,000 in 2005. The Asian Development Bank 2007 economic report on Nauru estimated GDP per capita at US$2,400 to US$2,715.

Nauru does not levy any personal taxes. The unemployment rate is estimated to be 23%, and the government employs 95% of those who have jobs. The Asian Development Bank notes that, although the administration has a strong public mandate to implement economic reforms, in the absence of an alternative to phosphate mining, the medium-term outlook is for continued dependence on external assistance. Tourism is not a major contributor to the economy.

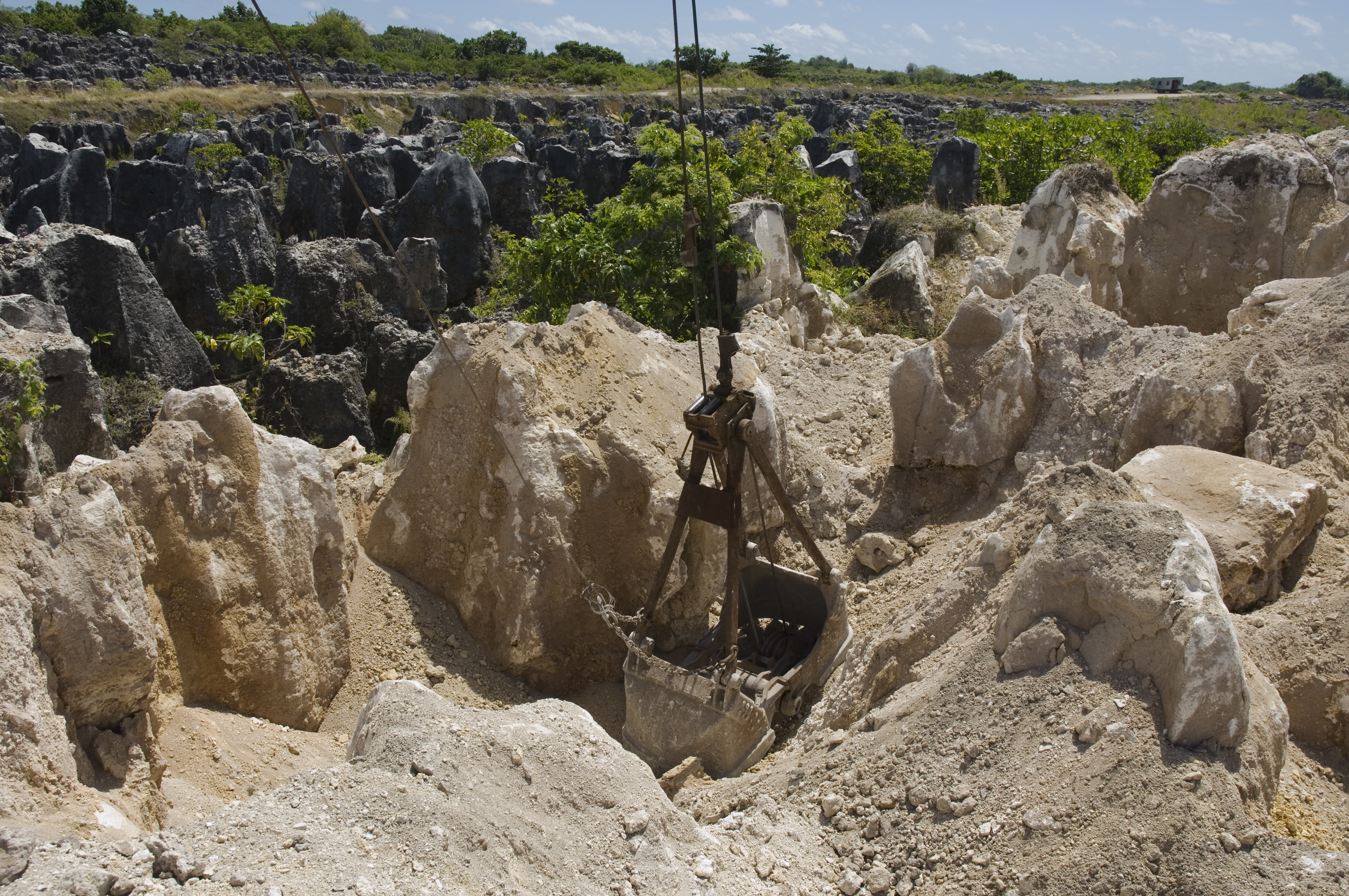
Limestone pinnacles remain after phosphate mining at the site of one of Nauru's secondary mines

In the 1990s, Nauru became a tax haven and offered passports to foreign nationals for a fee. The inter-governmental Financial Action Task Force on Money Laundering (FATF) identified Nauru as one of 15 "non-cooperative" countries in its fight against money laundering. During the 1990s, it was possible to establish a licensed bank in Nauru for US$25,000 (US$44,347 in 2025) with no other requirements. Under pressure from FATF, Nauru introduced anti-avoidance legislation in 2003, after which foreign hot money left the country. In October 2005, after satisfactory results from the legislation and its enforcement, FATF lifted the non-cooperative designation.

From 2001 to 2007, the detention centre provided a significant source of income for the country. Nauruan authorities reacted with concern to its closure by Australia. In February 2008, Foreign Affairs Minister Kieren Keke, stated that the closure would result in 100 Nauruans losing their jobs, and would affect 10% of the island's population directly or indirectly: "We have got a huge number of families that are suddenly going to be without any income. We are looking at ways we can try and provide some welfare assistance but our capacity to do that is very limited. Literally we have got a major unemployment crisis in front of us." The detention centre was re-opened in August 2012. As of 2017, its operations account for 35% of Nauru's GDP.

In July 2017, the OECD upgraded its rating of Nauru's standards of tax transparency. Nauru had previously been listed alongside fourteen other countries that had failed to show that they could comply with international tax transparency standards and regulations. The OECD subsequently put Nauru through a fast-tracked compliance process and the country was given a "largely compliant" rating.

The 2017–2018 budget, delivered by Minister of Finance David Adeang, forecast A$128.7 million in revenues and A$128.6 million in expenditures and projected modest economic growth for the country over the next two years. In 2018, the government partnered with the deep sea mining company DeepGreen, now Nauru Ocean Resources Inc (NORI), a wholly owned subsidiary of Canadian The Metals Company. They planned to harvest manganese nodules whose minerals and metals can be used in the development of sustainable energy technology.

In March 2025, Nauru announced a "golden passport" initiative with the aim of raising money to relocate 90% of the island's population to a new community on higher ground. Citizenship will cost a minimum of $105,000 and does not require residency.

== Demographics ==
The population of Nauru, 1886–2013

Nauru had 12,511 residents as of 2021. The population was previously larger, but in 2006 1,500 people left during a repatriation of immigrant workers from Kiribati and Tuvalu. The repatriation was motivated by significant layoffs in phosphate mining.

The official languages are Nauruan and English. Nauruan is a distinct Micronesian language, which is spoken by 96% of ethnic Nauruans at home. English is widely spoken and is the language of government and commerce. Nauruan Pidgin English is an endangered English-based pidgin, formed through the merger of the extinct Chinese Pidgin English and some form of Pacific Pidgin English.

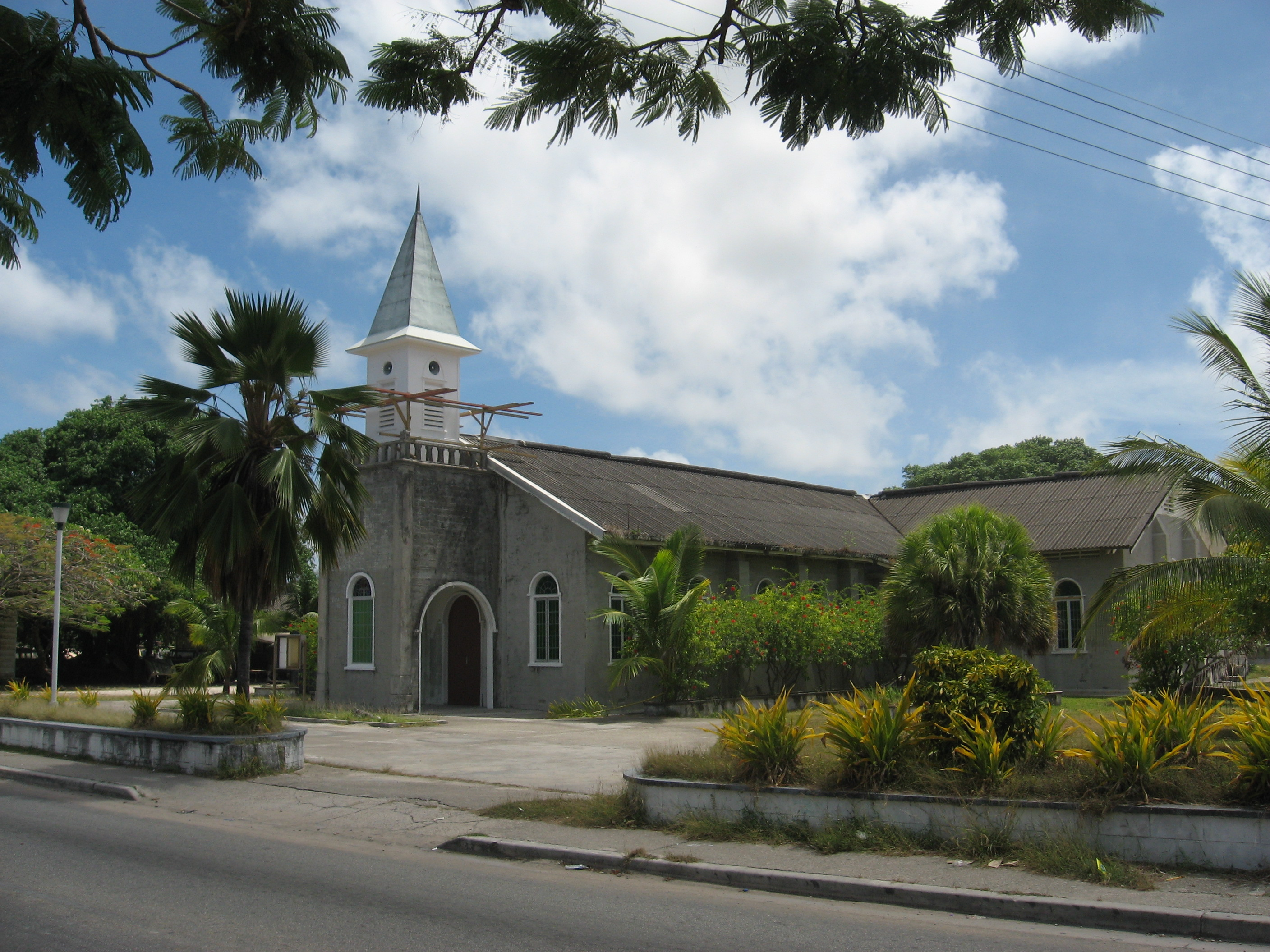
Church in Nauru

The main religion in 2021 was Christianity: the main denominations were the Nauru Congregational Church (34.3%), the Catholic Church (33.9%) and the Assemblies of God (11.7%). Although the constitution provides for freedom of religion, the government has restricted the religious practices of the Church of Jesus Christ of Latter-day Saints and the Jehovah's Witnesses, most of whom are foreign workers employed by the government-owned Nauru Phosphate Corporation. The Catholics are pastorally served by the Roman Catholic Diocese of Tarawa and Nauru, with see at Tarawa.

== Public services ==
=== Education ===
Literacy is 96%. Education is compulsory for children from six to sixteen years old, and two more non-compulsory years are offered (years 11 and 12). There are three primary schools and two secondary schools (Nauru Secondary School and Nauru College). There is a campus of the University of the South Pacific on Nauru. Before this campus was built in 1987, students would study either by distance or abroad. Since 2011, the University of New England, Australia has established a presence with about 30 Nauruan teachers studying for an associate degree in education. The Nauru Community Library is in the new University of the South Pacific Nauru Campus building. Other sites with libraries include Nauru Secondary, Kayser College, and Aiwo Primary.

=== Health ===
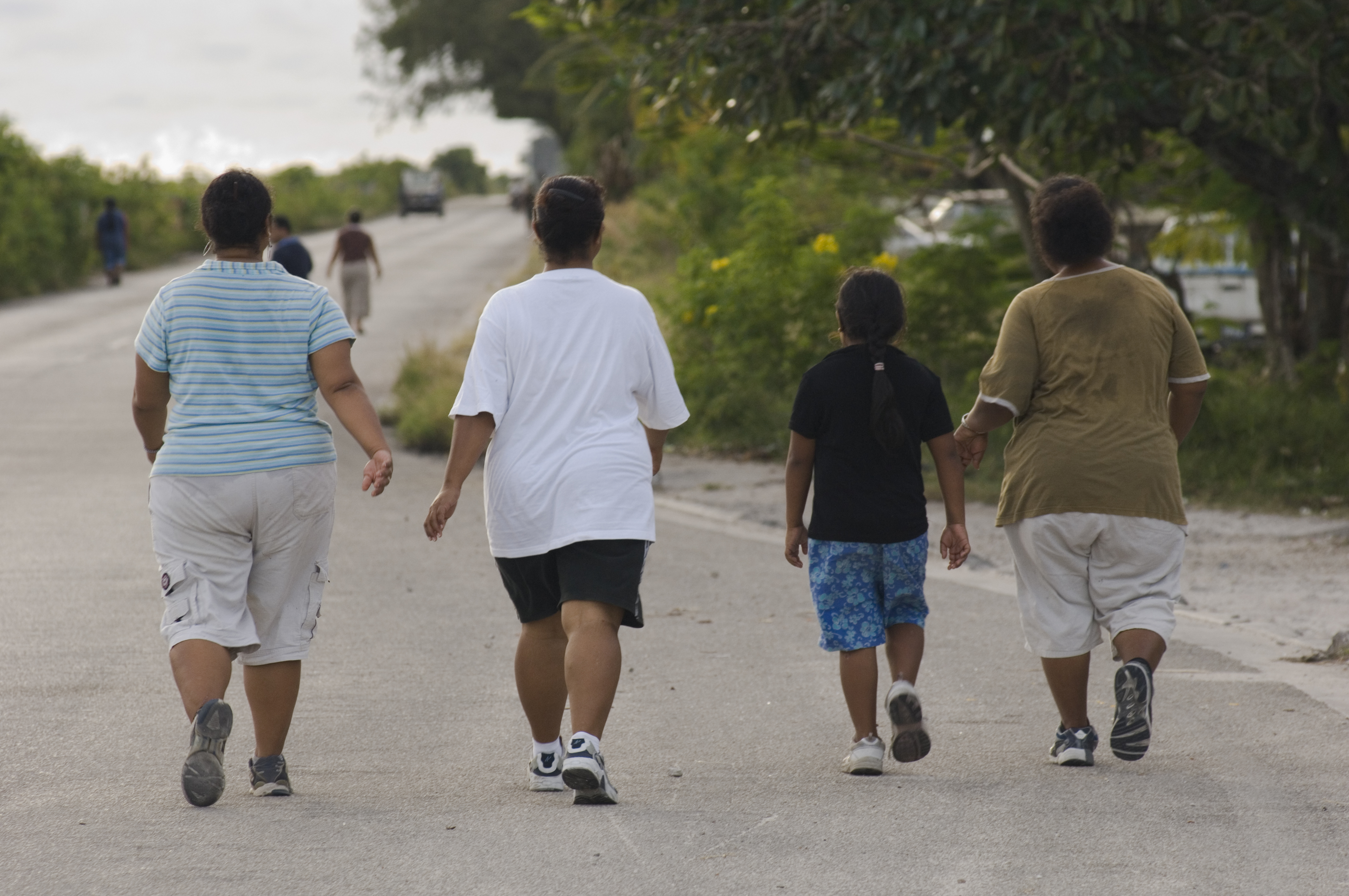
Nauruan residents walking around Nauru International Airport. Nauruans are among the most obese people in the world.

Nauru has one of the highest child mortality rates in the Pacific Island Countries and Territories region at 2.9% in 2020, according to a UNICEF study. In 2009, life expectancy, which averages in child mortality, was 60.6 years for males and 68.0 years for females.

By measure of mean body mass index (BMI), Nauruans are the most overweight people in the world; 97% of men and 93% of women are overweight or obese. In 2012, the obesity rate was 71.7%. Nauru has the world's highest level of type 2 diabetes, with more than 40% of the population affected. Other significant dietary-related problems include kidney disease and heart disease. Nauru has the world's highest tobacco smoking rate (48.3% in 2022).

== Transport ==
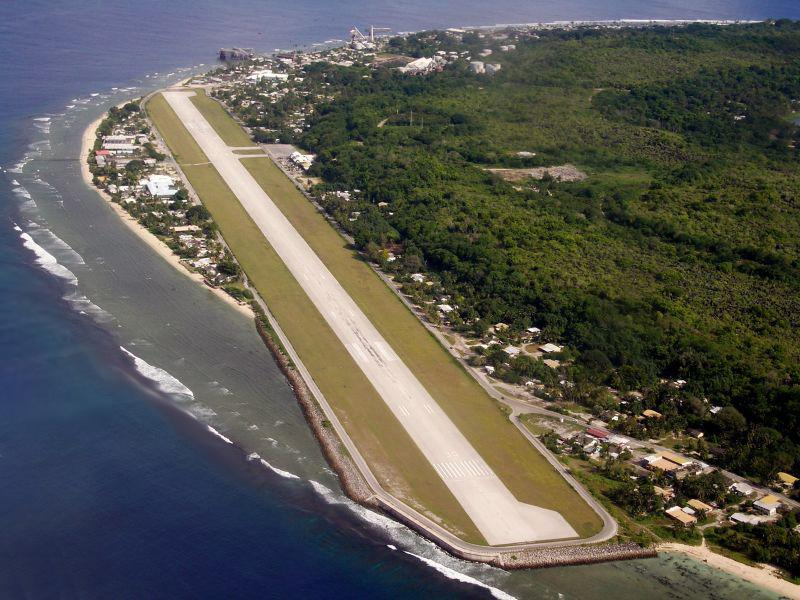
View of Nauru International Airport

The island is solely served by Nauru International Airport. Passenger service is provided by Nauru Airlines. Flights operate four days a week to Brisbane, Australia, with limited service to other destinations including Nadi (Fiji) and Bonriki (Kiribati).

The island has about 30 km (19 mi) of road, and it has about 4 km (2.5 mi) of railway that was built for mining use a century ago. Nauru is accessible by sea via the Nauru International Port. The Nauru Port was modernized and expaned over several years, with the final work bein completed in 2025.project of the former Aiwo Boat Harbor was expected to be completed in 2021.

== Food, farming, and diet ==
=== Farming ===
Historically, Nauruans kept household gardens that provided much of the food that they needed through subsistence farming, with the most common food plants including coconuts, breadfruit, bananas, pandanus, papaya, and guavas. Because of the large immigrant population that worked in the phosphate mines, many types of fruits and vegetables were grown that were staples in those countries as well. The soil in Nauru was very rich on what citizens call the "Topside", the raised phosphate plateau where the phosphate is mined from, and it was extremely fertile. However, the area where most Nauruans live now, on the coastal ring on the island that has not been mined, the soil quality is among the poorest in the world, as it is shallow, alkaline, and has the coarse texture of the coral that surrounds it. In 2011, just 13% of households maintained a garden or were involved in growing crops.

Most of the soil that was on Nauru is now gone because of phosphate-mining activities, leaving people to import the soil that they need. Ethnobotanical studies have indicated that the reduction in the types of plants that can be grown due to phosphate mining has significantly affected the connection that Nauruans feel to the land, as plants are a large part of their cultural identity and have many uses in their lives, with each plant having an average of seven uses in Pacific Island cultures.

=== Food ===
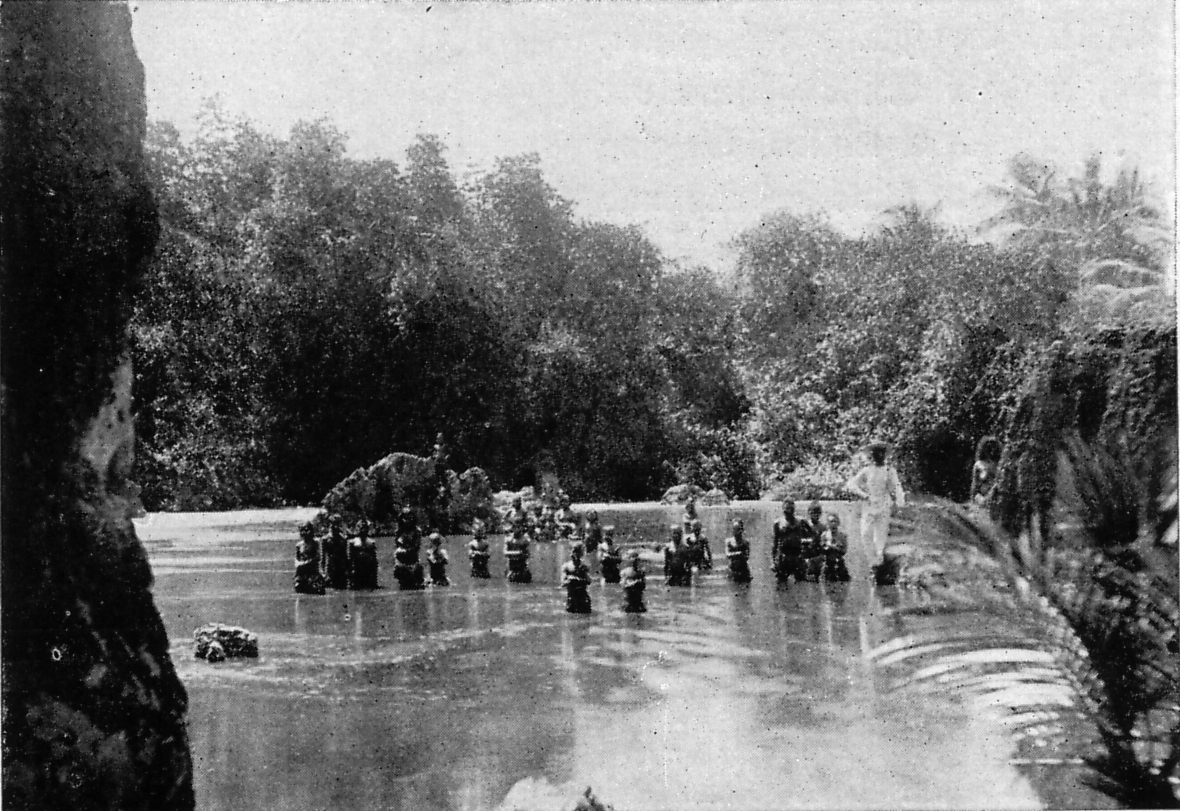
Fishing in Buada Lagoon, Nauru (1938)

For residents today, all food must also be imported because of the loss of 90% of arable land due to phosphate mining, leaving people with a diet of mainly processed foods, such as rice and sugar. Though residents are trying to salvage the soil that they can, some researchers speculate that there will be no regeneration of soils even after the mining ceases. The country's dependence on processed and imported foods along with "cultural, historical, and social factors" have greatly affected the health of its citizens. Despite having all food imported, the Household and Income Expenditure Survey conducted 2012–2013 finds that Nauruans have a food poverty incidence rate of 0, based on the food poverty line which "includes a daily intake of 2,100 calories per adult per day".

=== Non-food basic needs ===
24% of the population and 16.8% of households are below the basic needs (clothing, shelter, education, transport, communication, water, sanitation and health services) poverty line. This is the worst poverty index of all Pacific nations. In 2017, half of Nauruans were living on US$9,000 per year. Water resources are extremely limited, with the island supplying enough for 32 litres (7.0 imp gal; 8.5 US gal) of freshwater per person per day despite the WHO's recommendation of 50 litres (11 imp gal; 13 US gal) per person per day. Much of the groundwater has been contaminated by mining runoff, toilets, and dumping of other commercial and household wastes, causing Nauruans to rely on imported water (the price of which can vary as it is closely tied to fuel prices for its delivery) and rainfall storage. Access to sanitation facilities is restricted with just 66% of residents having access to reliable toilets, and open defecation is still practiced by 3% of the population. Schools are frequently forced to close because they do not have reliable toilets or drinking water for students to use. There is a long-standing truancy problem, and accessibility of education for refugee and asylum-seeking children, as well as for disabled children, remain areas of concern for Nauru's education sector.

== Culture ==
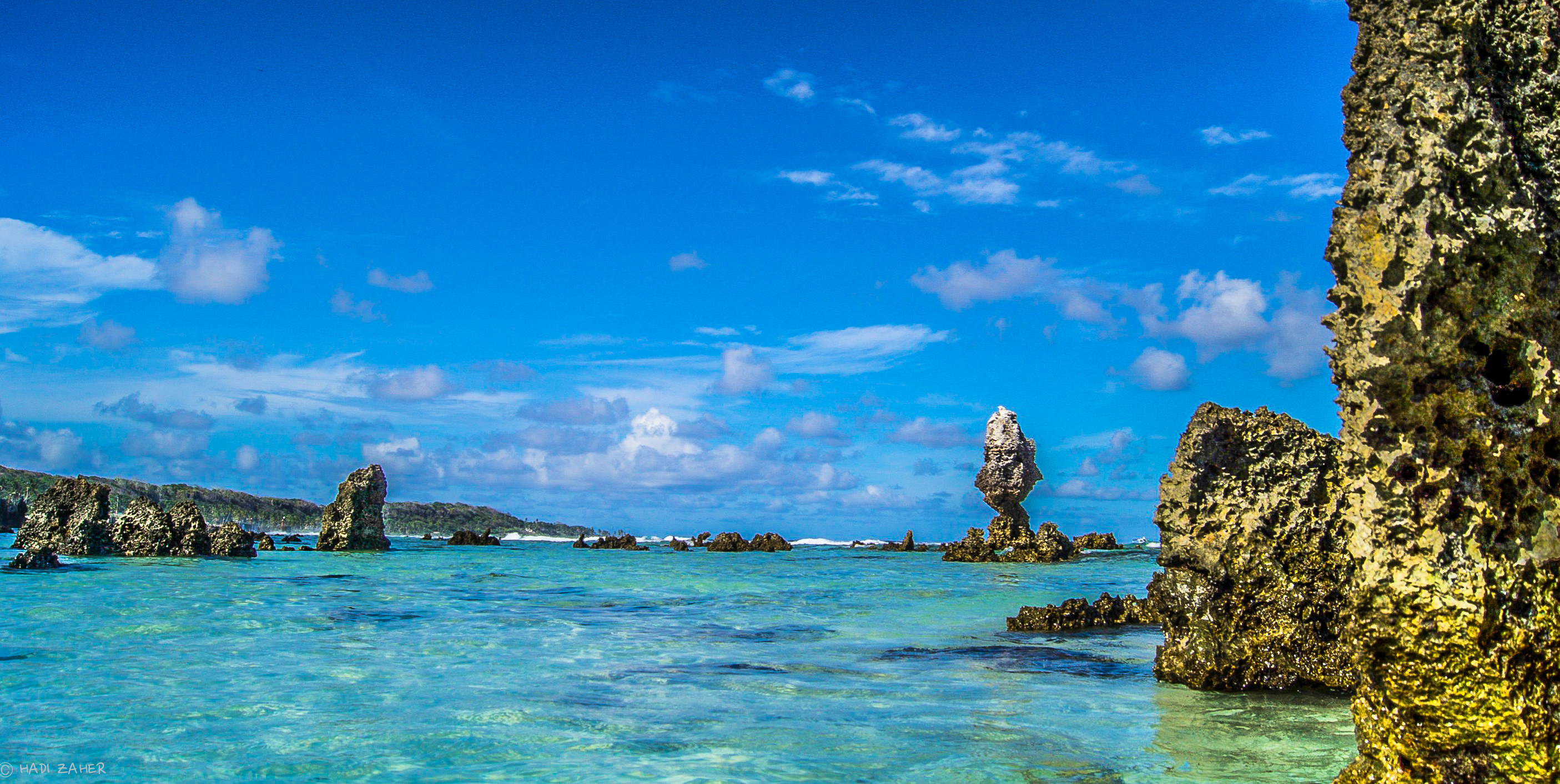
Anibare Bay

Angam Day, held on 26 October, celebrates the recovery of the Nauruan population after the two world wars and the 1920 influenza epidemic. Colonial and contemporary Western influence has largely displaced the indigenous culture. Few older customs have been preserved, but some forms of traditional music, arts and crafts, and fishing are still practised.

Nauruan folk songs existed as of 1970; "Oh Bwio Eben Bwio" remains a noticeable folk song. Rhythmic singing and traditional reigen (Note: Indirectly influenced by German colonialism, reigen in this cultural context is a German word that implies styles of circular-moving dances in Nauru's historical past, implying that historical Nauruan traditional dances tend to be informal.) are performed particularly at celebrations. A historical form of a Nauruan dance called "fish dance" in English was recorded in a form of photographs. Known contemporary dances are the frigate bird dance and the dogoropa. The national anthem is "Nauru Bwiema" ("Song of Nauru").

=== Media ===
Nauru has no daily news publications, but it does have a fortnightly publication, Mwinen Ko. A state-owned television station, Nauru Television (NTV), broadcasts programs from New Zealand and Australia, and a state-owned non-commercial radio station, Radio Nauru, carries programs from Radio Australia and the BBC.

=== Sport ===
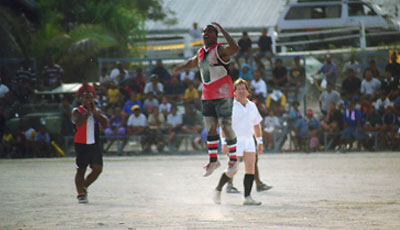
Australian rules football, played at Linkbelt Oval

Australian rules football is the most popular sport; it is considered the national team sport. There is an Australian rules football league with eight teams. Nauru has several national Australian rules teams that consistently rank among the top eight teams in the world.

Other sports include weightlifting (considered a national pastime), volleyball, netball, fishing and tennis. Nauru participates in the Commonwealth Games and has participated in the Summer Olympic Games in weightlifting and judo.

Rugby union in Nauru has a growing following. The Nauru national rugby sevens team made its international debut at the 2015 Pacific Games. Nauru competed in the 2015 Oceania Sevens Championship in New Zealand. Soccer in Nauru is a minor sport which has long been dormant in due to the popularity of Australian rules football; the Nauru national soccer team is a proposed team.

== See also ==
- Index of Nauru-related articles
- Outline of Nauru
