= Constitution of Nauru =

Pacific National Constitution

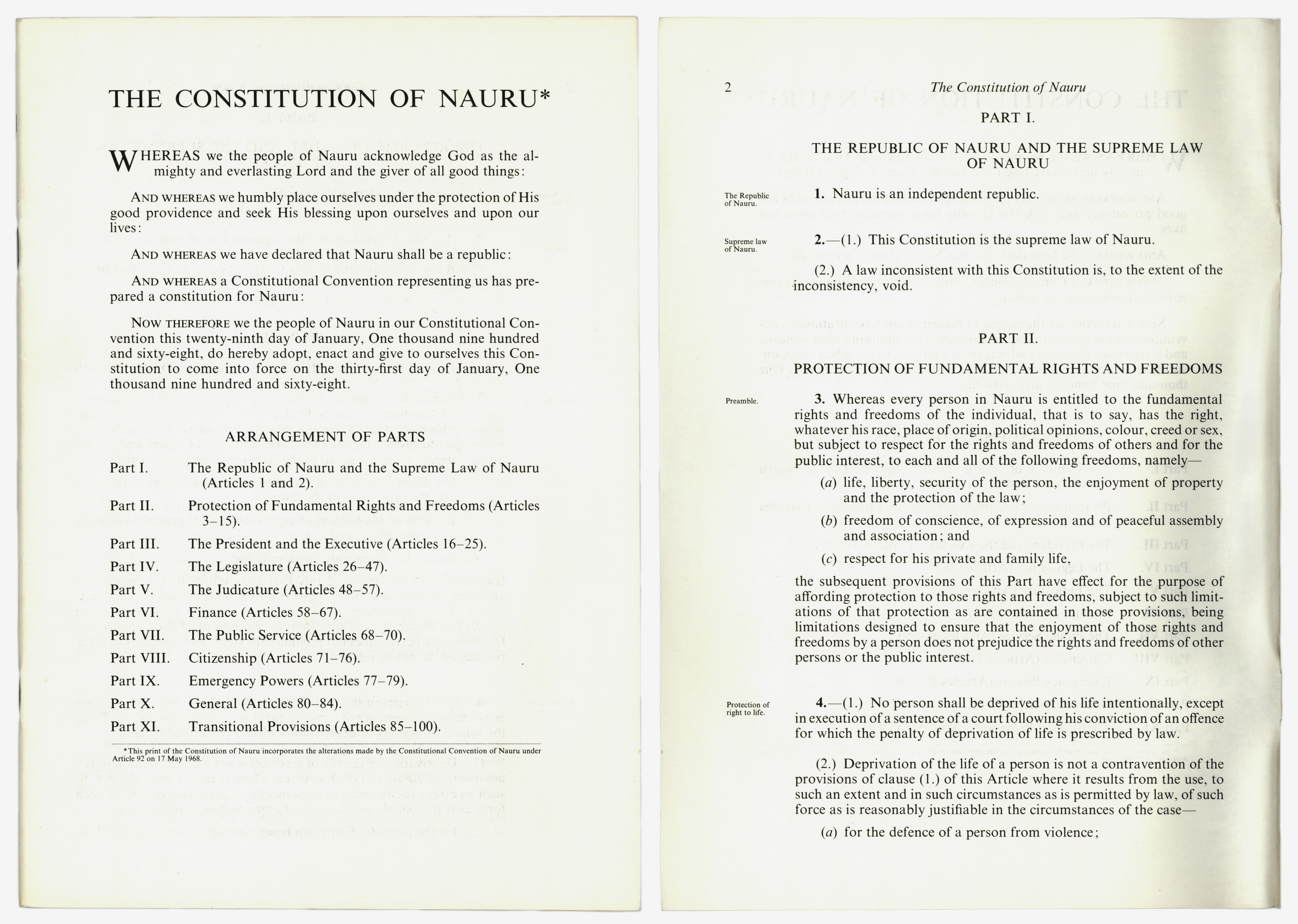
The Constitution of Nauru

The constitution of the Republic of Naoero was adopted following national independence on 31 January 1968.

In 2007 there were political debates in progress with a view to amend aspects of the Constitution, owing to the challenge of widely acknowledged political instability. One notable issue being discussed was the possibility of making the office of President of Nauru directly elected by the population, instead of the office being indirectly elected by the Parliament of Nauru. Owing to frequent recourse to the votes of no confidence, changes of President have been frequent (i.e.: Bernard Dowiyogo was appointed President of Nauru a total of seven times, prior to his death in 2003). Supporters of making the office of President independent of a Parliamentary vote hope that increased stability will ensure from the adoption of such a measure. Skeptics are concerned that attempts may arise to set aside the elected President through the courts; bearing in mind also that under the Nauruan court system some appeals are actually heard in Australia.

== Arrangement of Parts ==
The Constitution of Nauru is divided into 11 parts and 6 schedules:

Part I (Articles 1 and 2) - The Republic of Naoero and the Supreme Law of Naoero
Part II (Articles 3-15) - Protection of Fundamental Rights and Freedoms
Part III (Articles 16-25) - The President and the Executive
Part IV (Articles 26-47) - The Legislature
Part V (Articles 48-57) - The Judicature
Part VI (Articles 58-67) - Finance
Part VII (Articles 68-70) - The Public Service
Part VIII (Articles 71-76) - Citizenship
Part IX (Articles 77-79) - Emergency Powers
Part X (Articles 80-84) - General Provisions
Part XI (Articles 85-100) - Transitional Provisions
