= Classification Office (New Zealand) =

Media classification agency in New Zealand

- Te Mana Whakaatu (Māori)
- Logo as of 2020

Agency overview
- Formed: 1 October 1994; 32 years ago
- Preceding agencies: Indecent Publications Tribunal; Chief Censor of Films; Video Recordings Authority
- Type: Crown entity
- Jurisdiction: New Zealand Government
- Headquarters: Level 1 88 The Terrace Wellington, New Zealand; 41°16′55″S 174°46′29″E
- Motto: "Kōreō Tahi. Mātaki Tahi. Talk Together. Watch Together."
- Employees: 26
- Annual budget: $3,794,000 NZD (2021)
- Minister responsible: Hon Brooke van Velden, Minister of Internal Affairs
- Agency executives: Caroline Flora, Chief Censor of Film and Literature; Rupert Ablett-Hampson, Deputy Chief Censor of Film and Literature
- Key document: Films, Videos, and Publications Classification Act 1993
- Website: www.classificationoffice.govt.nz

The Office of Film and Literature Classification (Māori: Te Tari Whakarōpū Tukuata, Tuhituhinga), branded as the Classification Office (Māori: Te Mana Whakaatu), is an independent Crown entity established under Films, Videos, and Publications Classification Act 1993 responsible for censorship and classification of publications in New Zealand. A "publication" is defined broadly to be anything that shows an image, representation, sign, statement, or word. This includes films, video games, books, magazines, CDs, T-shirts, street signs, jigsaw puzzles, drink cans, and slogans on campervans. The Chief Censor, Caroline Flora, is the chair of the Office.

Films must be given a classification before they can be exhibited or supplied to the public. This is done either by the Film and Video Labelling Body or the Office.

Any person may submit any publication for classification by the Office, with the permission of the Chief Censor. However, the Secretary for Internal Affairs, the Comptroller of Customs, the Commissioner of Police, and the Film and Video Labelling Body may submit publications for classification without the Chief Censor's permission. The courts have no jurisdiction to classify publications. If the classification of a publication becomes an issue in any civil or criminal proceeding, the court must submit the publication to the Office.

Any person who is dissatisfied with a decision of the Office may have the relevant publication, but not the Office's decision, reviewed by the Film and Literature Board of Review.

The Office also has a role in providing information to the public about classification decisions and about the classification system as a whole. It conducts research and produces evidence-based resources to promote media literacy and help people to make informed choices about the content they consume.

== Classification law ==
The Office classifies material based on whether it is likely to be "harmful" or "injurious to the public good." Specifically: "a publication is objectionable if it describes, depicts, expresses, or otherwise deals with matters such as sex, horror, crime, cruelty, or violence in such a manner that the availability of the publication is likely to be injurious to the public good." The Censorship Compliance Unit of the Department of Internal Affairs is responsible for the enforcement of the FVPC Act.

In 2000 the Court of Appeal of New Zealand decided in Living Word Distributors Limited v Human Rights Action Group (Wellington) [2000] NZCA 179 (a case involving two videos produced by Jeremiah Films) that the juxtaposition of the words "sex, horror, crime, cruelty or violence" tends to point to activity rather than to the expression of opinion or attitude. On this interpretation, the Office had jurisdiction to restrict or ban publications describing or depicting sexual activities, but not those describing only an attitude or opinion about sex. The same interpretation required publications to describe or depict horror activities, criminal activities, cruel activities, and violent activities, rather than just an opinion or attitude about those things, for the Office to be able to classify them.

The Court of Appeal explicitly ruled that the phrase "matters such as sex" is strongly indicative of sexual activities and does not include sexual orientation. This made it more difficult for the Office to restrict or ban publications that simply exploited the nudity of children or portrayed classes of people as inherently inferior, but did not show any of the specified types of activity, notwithstanding the fact the FVPC Act directs the censors to give "particular weight" to these things when deciding whether or not to restrict or ban a publication. It also made it difficult for the Office to restrict publications simply containing offensive language or to ban videos of persons taken without their knowledge or consent, such as "upskirt" videos, on the ground of invasion of privacy, again because neither type of publication shows any of the specified types of activity. In 2005, Parliament amended the FVPC Act, and commenced amendment of the Crimes Act, to restore the Office's jurisdiction over all of these matters except for publications that simply portray classes of people as inherently inferior.

Under the FVPC Act material that promotes, supports, or tends to promote or support the following is deemed objectionable (banned):

- Sexual exploitation of children
- Coercion
- Extreme violence, torture, and/or cruelty
- Bestiality
- Necrophilia
- Urophilia
- Coprophilia

In 2019, the Labour Government announced a regulatory change to bring commercial video on demand content from services like Netflix and Lightbox under the Films, Videos, and Publications Classification Act 1993. This change, which came into force on 1 February 2022, requires major streaming services operating in New Zealand to rate content using an approved self-rating system. The Office approves these systems but they are developed and run by streaming services themselves.

Also on 1 February 2022, the Act was amended to give the Chief Censor the ability to issue urgent interim classification assessments for publications which are "likely to be objectionable", effectively banning them temporarily. This power was used by Acting Chief Censor Rupert Ablett-Hampson to urgently assess a manifesto attributed to the perpetrator of the 2022 Buffalo, New York mass shooting, and a livestream of the attack. Both publications were later permanently banned.

== Chief Censor ==
The chairperson of the Classification Office is the Chief Censor, a position that is selected by the Governor-General on the recommendation of the Minister of Internal Affairs with the agreement of the Minister of Women's Affairs and the Minister of Justice.

The Chief Censor has the power to "call in" publications that have not come to the Office for classification, requiring the publisher to submit the publication for classification.

=== List of Chief Censors ===
- William Jolliffe 1916–1927
- W. A. Tanner 1927–1937
- W. A. von Keisenberg 1938–1949
- Gordon Mirams 1949–1959
- Douglas McIntosh 1960–1976
- Bernard Tunnicliffe 1977–1983
- Arthur Everard 1984–1990
- Jane Wrightson 1991–1993
- Kathryn Paterson 1994–1998
- Bill Hastings 1999–2010
- Andrew Jack 2011–2017
- David Shanks 2017–2022
- Caroline Flora 2022–present

== Case studies ==
=== 13 Reasons Why ===
Chief Censor Andrew Jack used his call-in power to classify the Netflix series 13 Reasons Why in 2017 and his successor David Shanks called in the second series in 2018. The Chief Censors were concerned that New Zealand audiences needed to be warned about rape and suicide in the series. New Zealand has the highest youth suicide rate in the OECD.

The series was given a specially created RP18 classification which means that someone under 18 must be supervised by a parent or guardian when viewing the series, which Netflix was required to display.

=== A Star Is Born ===
A Star Is Born (2018) was not classified by the Classification Office when it released in New Zealand. It had been rated an M in Australia so was automatically cross-rated M (Unrestricted, suitable for 16 years and over) in New Zealand by the Film & Video Labelling Body. At that stage, it carried a descriptive note 'Sex scenes, offensive language and drug use.' The Chief Censor required that the warning note be updated to include 'suicide' after receiving complaints from members of the public, including health care providers. The film contains a scene depicting a suicide by hanging; this is the most common method of suicide in New Zealand.

The Film & Video Labelling Body issued a new certificate to be displayed and alerted exhibitors to the note change so that they could update their information. Where possible, the distributor must update the label on all advertising.

=== The March 15 attack publications ===
Chief Censor David Shanks called in the livestream video of the Christchurch mosque shootings on 15 March 2019. The Office classified the full 17 minute footage as objectionable on 18 March 2019 due to its depiction and promotion of extreme violence and terrorism.

A 74-page publication (referred to as The Great Replacement) reportedly written by the perpetrator of the Christchurch mosque shootings was also called in by Chief Censor David Shanks. It was officially classified as objectionable in New Zealand on 23 March 2019.

The publication was found to provide justification for the Christchurch mosque shootings and to promote further acts of murder, terrorist violence, and extreme cruelty against identified groups of people. The objectionable classification was not due to the racist and extremist views expressed in the publication but due to the high likelihood of serious and fatal harm resulting from the continued availability of the publication.

Both decisions were reviewed by the Film and Literature Board of Review which also found the publications to be objectionable for the same reasoning as the Office. Publications found to be objectionable are illegal to possess or distribute in New Zealand without the express authority of the Office. The decisions of the Office and the Board of Review are only applicable to New Zealand and the publications continue to be legally available in other parts of the world.

== Research ==
The Classification Office undertakes research about entertainment media content, media impacts, classification and censorship. Recent projects have investigated young New Zealanders experiences and views about sexual violence in entertainment media, and online pornography.

Published	Title
2022	What We're Watching: New Zealanders' views about what we see on screen and online
2021	The Edge of the Infodemic
2020	Growing Up with Porn
2019	Breaking Down Porn: A Classification Office Analysis of Commonly Viewed Pornography in NZ
2018	NZ Youth and Porn:Research findings of a survey on how and why young New Zealanders view online pornography
2016–2017	Young New Zealanders Viewing Sexual Violence
2017	Children and teen exposure to media content
2016	Understanding the Classification System: New Zealanders' Views
2016	Standardised classifications across different platforms
2015	Attitudes towards classification labels 2015
2014	Comparing Classifications: feature films and video games 2012 & 2013
2013	Young People's Research
2013	Comparing classifications 2010 & 2011
2013	Attitudes towards classification labels
2012	What people think about film classification systems
2011	Guidance and Protection: What New Zealanders want from the classification system for films and games
2011	Understanding the Classification System: New Zealanders' views
2010	Young People's Use of Entertainment Mediums 2010
2010	Parents and Gaming Literacy
2009	Report of a Public Consultation about The Last House on the Left
2009	A Review of Research on Sexual Violence in Audio-Visual Media
2009	Public Perceptions of a Violent Video Game X-Men Origins: Wolverine
2008	Viewing Violence: Audience Perceptions of Violent Content in Audio-Visual Entertainment
2007	Public Perceptions of Highly Offensive Language
2007	Public Understanding of Censorship
2006	Young People's Use of Entertainment Mediums
2005	The Viewing Habits of Users of Sexually Explicit Movies: a Hawke's Bay sample
2005	Underage Gaming Research
2004	The Viewing Habits of Users of Sexually Explicit Movies
2003	A Guide to the Research into the Effects of Sexually Explicit Films and Videos
2002	Public opinion research on sexually explicit videos
2001	Public consultation on sexually explicit videos
2000	Public and Professional Views Concerning the Classification and Rating of Films and Videos

== Community engagement ==
The Classification Office also regularly convenes panels that are demographically representative of New Zealand as a whole to assist it with the classification of particular publications. It has convened public panels to assist it with the classification of films such as Baise-moi, Salo, Monster's Ball, Irréversible, Silent Hill, Du er ikke alene, Lolita, 8MM and Hannibal.

More frequently, the Office consults experts to assist it with the classification of various publications. For example, religious experts were consulted to assist with the classification of The Passion of the Christ, experts in road safety were consulted on Mischief Destroy, the Children's Commissioner on Ken Park and The Aristocrats, homeopathic practitioners on drug manufacturing books written by Steve Preisler, and rape crisis centres and psychologists on Irréversible and an edition of the University of Otago student magazine Critic.

Each year the Office consults media studies students in its high school programme called Censor for a Day, during which an unreleased film is shown to high school students, who are then asked to classify it applying the criteria in the Films, Videos, and Publications Classification Act 1993. The students' classification is compared with, and usually identical to, the film's actual classification. Films used for Censor for a Day have included BlacKkKlansman, Get Out, Blockers, and Super Dark Times.

The Office works with a Youth Advisory panel of diverse young people aged 16–19 who provide a youth voice on media in New Zealand. Meetings are held once a month and are around two hours long. During the meetings, panel members express their views and perspectives on issues to do with potential media harms that impact on young people in New Zealand and the way the Classification Office responds to those issues. After a robust discussion, the panel members brainstorm what potential tangible outcomes could look like.

The panel regularly participate in classification assessments of upcoming feature films. Recently they helped with the classification of Boy Erased, Good Boys, and Booksmart. Their discussion is summarised in the classification decisions for those films.

== Labels ==
The FVPC Act gives the Classification Office the power to classify publications into three categories: unrestricted, restricted, and "objectionable" or banned. Unrestricted films are assigned a green or yellow rating label. Restricted films are assigned a red classification label.

Since early 2013 some DVDs and Blu-rays released in New Zealand have had the rating label printed on the cover to prevent the removal of the label, which is illegal.

New Zealand has used a colour-coded labelling system since 1987. The colours are intended to resemble the messages conveyed by a traffic light: a green label means that nothing in the film, video or DVD should inhibit anyone from viewing it; a yellow label means proceed with caution because the film, video or DVD may have content that younger viewers should not see; and a red label means stop and ensure that no one outside the restriction views the film, video, DVD or computer game. It is an offence to supply age-restricted material to anyone under the age shown on the label.

The current classification system was introduced in 1993, harmonising the previously different standards for film and video. The following classifications are currently in use:

Label	Name	Definition
G	General	Suitable for general audiences.
PG	Parental Guidance	Parental guidance recommended for younger viewers.
M	Mature	Suitable for (but not restricted to) mature audiences 16 years and up.
RP13	RP13	Restricted to people 13 years of age and over, unless accompanied by a parent or guardian.
R13	R13	Restricted to people 13 years of age and over.
	R15	Restricted to people 15 years of age and over.
RP16	RP16	Restricted to people 16 years of age and over, unless accompanied by a parent or guardian.
R16	R16	Restricted to people 16 years of age and over.
RP18	RP18	Restricted to people 18 years of age and over unless accompanied by a parent or guardian.
R18	R18	Restricted to people 18 years of age and over.
R	Restricted	Restricted to a particular class of people, or for particular purposes, or both, specified by the Office of Film and Literature Classification.
Streaming
M	M	Suitable for mature audiences.
13	13	Unsuitable for audiences under age of 13.
16	16	Unsuitable for audiences under age of 16.
18	18	Unsuitable for audiences under age of 18.

The RP18 rating is the newest rating, having been created in April 2017 specifically for the drama series 13 Reasons Why.

The Film and Video Labelling Body may award films, videos and DVDs an unrestricted classification of (G, PG or M) based on their Australian classification, or British classification if no Australian classification exists. The Office is the only body who may award restricted ratings.

== See also ==
- Censorship in New Zealand
