= Internet censorship in New Zealand =

Internet censorship in New Zealand refers to the New Zealand Government's system for filtering website traffic to prevent Internet users from accessing certain selected sites and material. While there are many types of objectionable content under New Zealand law, the filter specifically targets content depicting the sexual abuse or exploitation of children and young persons. The Department of Internal Affairs runs the filtering system, dubbed the Digital Child Exploitation Filtering System (DCEFS). It is voluntary for Internet Service Providers (ISPs) to join.

== History ==
In August 1993, the New Zealand Parliament passed the Films, Videos, and Publications Classification Act 1993, which made it the responsibility of the Department of Internal Affairs (DIA) to restrict objectionable content in the country. This act did not include any provisions for Internet content. In February 2005, the New Zealand Parliament amended the act to explicitly prevent ISPs from being prosecuted for their users transmitting objectionable content.

In March 2009, the Minister for Communications and IT, Steven Joyce, stated that the government had been following the controversy surrounding Internet censorship in Australia, and had no plans to introduce something similar in New Zealand. He acknowledged that filtering can cause delays for all Internet users, and that those who are determined to get around any filter will find a way to do so. Later in July of the same year, it was reported that the Department of Internal Affairs had plans to introduce Internet filtering in New Zealand. The project, using Swedish software, cost $150,000. February 2010 saw the first meeting of the Independent Reference Group, who were tasked with overseeing the responsible implementation of the DCEFS. In March 2010, a year after Joyce stated that there were no plans to do so, the Department of Internal Affairs stated that the filter was operational and in use. Tech Liberty NZ objected to the launch of the filter, but DIA defended the system and noted that trials over two years showed that the filter did not affect the speed or stability of the internet.

In March 2019, several websites disseminating footage of the Christchurch mosque shooting were censored by major ISPs in Australia and New Zealand, including Kiwi Farms, 4chan, 8chan, and LiveLeak.

In June 2024, the DCEFS web filter was upgraded to implement the Internet Watch Foundation filter.

== Technical details ==
A diagram of the request life cycle for a user of an ISP who has implemented the DCEFS

The Department of Internal Affairs maintains a hidden list of banned URLs and their internet addresses on a NetClean WhiteBox server, which, in 2009, contained over 7000 websites. The DIA then uses the Border Gateway Protocol to tell ISPs that they have the best connection to those internet addresses.

When a user tries to access a website, the ISP will automatically send their data through the best connection possible. If the user is trying to access a website hosted at an internet address that the DIA claims to have the best connection to, the ISP will divert the traffic to the DIA.

If the website the user is trying to access is on the DIA's list of banned URLs, then the connection is blocked by the WhiteBox server. The user is instead shown a filter notice page and has the option of getting counselling or anonymously appealing the ban.

If the website is not on the list of banned URLs, then the DIA transparently passes on the data to the actual website, and the user is left unaware that the request was checked.

== ISPs using the system ==
Some of the largest ISPs in New Zealand, including Spark New Zealand, One NZ, 2degrees, Compass, Kordia, Maxnet, Now, and Xtreme Networks, are using the DCEFS, which, as of 2017, make up over 75% of the domestic market, as well as 100% of cellular carriers.

== Legal backing ==
The Films, Videos, and Publications Classification Act of 1993 (FVPC Act) makes it the responsibility of the Department of Internal Affairs (DIA) to administer the restriction of objectionable content in the country. This includes the power to seize the offending publication, which was later interpreted to include images and video posted online, given that the original FVPC Act gave no guidelines for Internet content.

However, while the FVPC Act was interpreted to include the search and seizure of Internet content hosted in New Zealand, it wasn't possible for the DIA to directly take down the website in another jurisdiction. Furthermore, the FVPC Act doesn't give the DIA the right to mandate a block of objectionable content hosted in other jurisdictions, meaning that they can't create a compulsory filter.

The FVPC Act defines many forms of objectionable content, such as depictions of torture, degrading sexual acts, bestiality, sexual violence, abuse of children, and necrophilia, especially in conjunction with the promotion of discrimination, crime, terrorism or dehumanisation. Given the fact that the DIA couldn't make the filter compulsory for ISPs, they chose to choose to limit the filter to block the exploitation of children rather than targeting all objectionable content, as it is easy to garner public support for fighting child abuse.

== Positions ==
=== Support ===
The DIA implemented the DCEFS with the stated intent of preventing child predators from accessing child abuse images, thereby preventing their spread as much as possible. Proponents of the system tout its over one million blocks per month as evidence of its necessity as part of a multifaceted approach to combating child exploitation.

The DIA claims the system is helpful in educating users about this type of child abuse. The system also prevents innocent users from accidentally accessing images of child abuse, which the DIA claims is a public expectation of the government and ISPs.

In addition, supporters of the system argue that there is nothing inherently bad in ISPs offering internet filtering, as many ISPs offered it before the DCEFS was even built.

=== Against ===
Critics of the DCEFS have cited numerous problems, including performance, transparency, and security concerns. While the DIA claims that the filter will not cause issues, opponents of the system claimed that it has made major missteps, such as catching a Google-owned internet address in the filter, causing significant slowdowns. There are also concerns that the filter simply won't work, as it can be bypassed by commonly available technologies, such as using encryption or non-HTTP based file sharing methods.

Civil rights groups, such as TechLibertyNZ have criticised the system for its lack of transparency due to their refusal to release the list of what is being banned, as well as what they view as a purposefully hidden launch of the system. TechLibertyNZ claims that the government could secretly add other sites they want to restrict to the hidden list.

There are concerns over the security of such a system, mainly due to its use of the trust-based BGP protocol. If someone got access to the system, they could redirect any internet traffic in between New Zealand ISPs. The DIA argues this is not a vulnerability unique to the DCEFS and that their security is industry standard.

== See also ==
- Internet censorship
- Internet in New Zealand
- Censorship in New Zealand
