= Arthur Everard =

New Zealand film director

7th Chief Censor of New Zealand
- In office 1984–1990
- Preceded by: Bernard Tunnicliffe
- Succeeded by: Jane Wrightson

Personal details
- Born: 1935 (age 90–91)
- Education: Victoria University of Wellington

Arthur Everard (born 1935) is a filmmaker and journalist who served as the seventh Chief Censor of New Zealand.

Everard graduated with a BA in psychology from Victoria University of Wellington and worked for 19 years as a writer, editor and director at the National Film Unit. He directed films such as Margan’s Musical Move (1971) in which he captured the drama of classical music by filming tanks firing shells, and with John King, Sam Pillsbury and Paul Maunder, Games ‘74, a documentary about the 1974 Commonwealth Games held in Christchurch. His film Score, which set slow-motion footage of French rugby players to the music of Tchaikovsky, won a jury prize at the Montreal Film Festival.

Everard was appointed New Zealand’s seventh Chief Censor in February 1984. In an interview with Gordon Campbell published in the New Zealand Listener later that year, Everard explained that he did not think that the Chief Censor should be a defender of public morals or a defender of civil liberties. Instead he should be a referee “between a part of the public that wants to inflict its tastes and norms onto another section of the public. Other sections of the public want to inflict their desires and wishes onto the movie industry. Sections of the movie industry are wanting to exploit various sections of the public to get the money out of their back pockets. . . . And you’re sitting in the middle, trying to keep the peace.”

After passing the film I Spit on Your Grave in 1984, Everard’s tenure as Chief Censor was marked by attacks from Women Against Pornography and the Society for the Promotion of Community Standards ( the conservative Christian lobby group headed by Patricia Bartlett ), both of which campaigned for his removal. Women Against Pornography in particular called for “his resignation and the establishment of an independent tribunal of women to replace him.” Eventually, Parliament passed the Films Amendment Act in 1990 to impose a limit of six consecutive years on the length of time a person could remain Chief Censor, effectively forcing Everard from office in 1991. This provision remained in legislation describing the tenure and functions of the Chief Censor until it was repealed by the Films, Videos and Publications Amendment Act on 24 March 1999 while Bill Hastings was Acting Chief Censor.

Everard resumed making films after stepping down as Chief Censor, notably Gottfried Lindauer in New Zealand, about the nineteenth century painter of Maori portraits, and with Bronwen Stewart and Brian Lennane, To live in the city 24 years on, a 1991 documentary that traced the progress of four adults who were featured in a 1967 film about a Maori Affairs Department pre-employment scheme for young rural Maori. He also wrote record reviews for newspapers and the New Zealand Listener and is currently the science and technology correspondent for a wine and spirits industry publication.

Arthur Everard was succeeded as Chief Censor by Jane Wrightson.

== See also ==
- Censorship in New Zealand
