= Into the River =

2012 novel by Ted Dawe

- Author: Ted Dawe
- Genre: Young adult fiction
- Published: 2012
- Publisher: Mangakino University Press
- Publication place: New Zealand
- Pages: 279
- Awards: New Zealand Post Children's Book Awards, Best Young Adult Fiction and Margaret Mahy Book of the Year, 2013
- ISBN: 9780473205089

Into the River is a novel by Ted Dawe, featuring a coming-of-age story set in New Zealand, and intended for a young adult audience. It was awarded the Margaret Mahy Book of the Year prize and also won the top prize in the Young Adult Fiction category at the 2013 New Zealand Post Children's Book Awards. It was briefly banned from sale and supply in New Zealand.

== Plot summary ==
Set in New Zealand, the book tells the story of Māori youth Te Arepa Santos as he moves from the East Coast to Auckland to boarding school, where he has encounters with intimacy, sex, drugs, racism and death.

== Restrictions and banning ==
In 2013 New Zealand's Film and Literature Board of Review, on appeal from New Zealand's classification office (which had given the book an unrestricted M rating) restricted Into the River to readers aged 14 years and over. This was the first time in New Zealand's history this classification was used. Auckland Libraries applied to have this decision reconsidered in 2015. One of the reasons given for the appeal was "the impact that the restriction has had on the value of the book as a teaching resource, and the significance of the book as an aid to countering issues in New Zealand about bullying". The conservative Christian lobby group Family First appealed this decision, and applied for an interim restriction order, which was granted by the President of the Board of Review. The interim restriction order under New Zealand's Films, Videos and Publications Classification Act 1993, bans it completely from being sold or supplied in New Zealand.

This was the first time a book had been subject to an interim restriction order in New Zealand in 22 years and was reported by several foreign news media. The banning of the book has led to an increase of interest in it, something that has been cited as an example of the Streisand effect, in which an attempt to oppose something leads to its wider dissemination as an unintended side-effect. On 14 October 2015, the Film and Literature Board lifted the interim ban on Into the River; ruling by a majority that while aspects of the book were offensive it did not merit an age restriction. The ruling was welcomed by libraries and bookstores. In response, Family First director Bob McCoskrie accused the board of succumbing to book industry pressure despite what he alleged was the book's "highly offensive and gratuitous language, adult themes and graphic sexual content."

In response to the interim restriction order, MP Chris Bishop proposed a member's bill which would allow partial interim restriction orders, for example, applying the restriction order only to persons of a certain age. The Films, Videos, and Publications Classification (Interim Restriction Orders Classification) Amendment Bill was drawn from the ballot on 10 November 2016, and passed its third reading unanimously on 29 November 2017.

== Editions ==
Dawe initially self-published the book in 2012, before it was picked up by a local imprint of Penguin Random House.

- Into the River, Mangakino University Press, 2012. ISBN 9780473205089 (self published)
- Into the River, Longacre Child, 2013. ISBN 1775536033
- Into the River, Longacre Child, 2014. ISBN 1775536041

== Awards and reviews ==
In 2013 it won both Best Young Adult Fiction and Margaret Mahy Book of the Year at the New Zealand Post Children's Book Awards.

- New Zealand Post Children's Book Awards, Best Young Adult Fiction, 2013
- New Zealand Post Children's Book Awards, Margaret Mahy Book of the Year, 2013
- New Zealand Books: A quarterly review called the book a "visceral, bubblingly hormonal novel" and said "[I]t's a percussively authentic rendering. The elbowing, anarchic humour is tone-perfect."
- The World Socialist Web Site praised Dawe's "frankness and honesty" and stated: "His characters express widely held sentiments of bitterness, alienation and anger towards the social set-up, which find no reflection in the vast majority of films, TV shows and books."

== See also ==
- Censorship in New Zealand
- Book censorship
