= Mirams =

Mirams is an English surname.

Notable people with this surname include:

- Gordon Mirams (1909–1966), New Zealand film censor
- James Mirams (1839–1916), Australian politician
- Roger Mirams (1918–2004), New Zealand director
- Samuel Haywood Mirams (1837–1911), New Zealand engineer
- David Mirams (1943–2022), New Zealand, Historian Katyn Forest Massacre 1940
