= Indecent Publications Act =

Indecent Publications Act may refer to:

- Indecent Publications Act 1910 in New Zealand
- Indecent Publications Act 1963 in New Zealand
- Various state-based acts in Australia
