= Charities Services =

Charity regulator in New Zealand

- Ngā Rātonga Kaupapa Atawhai

Agency overview
- Headquarters: Wellington
- Minister responsible: Hon Louise Upston, Minister for the Community and Voluntary Sector
- Agency executives: Jane Wrightson, Chairperson; Charlotte Stanley, General manager
- Parent agency: Department of Internal Affairs
- Website: http://www.charities.govt.nz/

Charities Services, formerly known as the Charities Commission, is a New Zealand government agency established by the Charities Act 2005. Its responsibilities include:

- maintaining and monitoring a register of charities
- receiving annual returns and monitoring the activities of charities
- promoting public trust in charitable organisations
- providing education and assistance to the charitable sector
- encouraging best practice in governance and use of resources
- providing advice on matters relating to charities.

Charities Services is a division of the Department of Internal Affairs and has an independent five-person Board to make decisions about registering or deregistering charities.
