= Jenny Marcroft =

New Zealand politician (born 1963)

Jenny Marcroft MP
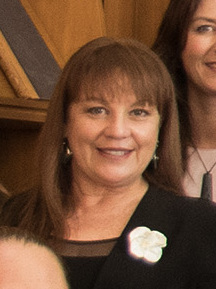
- Marcroft in 2018

Member of the New Zealand Parliament for New Zealand First party list
- Incumbent
- Assumed office 14 October 2023
- In office 23 September 2017 – 17 October 2020

Personal details
- Born: 1963 (age 62–63)
- Party: New Zealand First (until 2021; 2022–present)
- Other political affiliations: Labour (2021)
- Profession: Broadcaster

Jennifer Lyn Marcroft MP (born 1963) is a New Zealand politician and Member of Parliament in the House of Representatives for the New Zealand First party.

She served from 2017 to 2020, and returned in the 2023 New Zealand general election.

== Early life ==
Both Marcroft's parents died during her childhood leaving her an orphan at 16. She then lived with a violent step-father in Rotorua who motivated her to run away from home. She is part Māori on her father's side and identifies as Ngāpuhi. Marcroft's mother was a family friend of former Deputy-Prime Minister Don McKinnon, who supported her entry into politics.

== Broadcasting career ==
Marcroft had a career spanning over 30 years in the broadcasting industry, mostly reading the news on the radio for Independent Radio News, however she also read the news on television for TV3 at times. During her career she worked to ensure her pronunciation of Māori names was correct, receiving criticism for doing so. During the 1990s as a newsreader she was told not to say "kia ora" at the beginning of bulletins, but decided to persist anyway.

== Political career ==
New Zealand Parliament
Years	Term	Electorate	List	Party
2017–2020	52nd	List	9	NZ First
2023–2026	54th	List	5	NZ First
2026–present	55th	List	10	NZ First

=== First term, 2017–2020 ===
In 2017 election Marcroft stood for New Zealand First in the Tāmaki electorate and was placed ninth on New Zealand First's party list. She duly entered parliament via the party list.

Following the formation of a Labour-led coalition government on 19 October 2019, Marcroft was designated as New Zealand First's spokesperson on the Accident Compensation Corporation (ACC), arts, culture and heritage, broadcasting, communication IT, conservation, environment, health and human rights. On 15 November 2017, she was appointed to Parliament's environment select committee. On 24 October 2018, Marcroft was appointed to Parliament's health select committee. On 30 June 2019, Marcroft was appointed to the Parliamentary Service Commission's artworks committee.

On 23 October 2019, Marcroft successfully secured an amendment into David Seymour's End of Life Choice Bill that the Government hold a binding referendum on decriminalising euthanasia. In justifying her call for a referendum on euthanasia, Marcroft stated that "this issue basically, directly affects the fabric of society and so we believe that temporarily empowered politicians … we alone should not decide on the bill." Parliament voted by a tight margin of 63 to 57 to incorporate the referendum amendment into the Bill.

During the 2020 general election held on 17 October, Marcroft contested the Auckland Central electorate, coming sixth place. She and her fellow NZ First MPs also lost their seats after the party's vote dropped to 2.6%, below the five percent threshold needed to enter Parliament.

=== Out of Parliament, 2020–2023 ===
In late January 2021, Marcroft along with fellow former MP Tracey Martin left New Zealand First, expressing skepticism that the party would be able to contest the next general election and opining that the party needed to rebuild and return to its roots. She then subsequently joined the Labour Party. By October 2022 Marcroft was involved with New Zealand First again and was an attendant at the party's annual conference in Christchurch.

Following the 2022 Auckland mayoral election, incoming Auckland Mayor Wayne Brown hired Marcroft as an advisor.

At New Zealand First's campaign launch for the 2023 general election Marcroft announced the party's proposal to reform Pharmac and increase the medicines budget by 1.3 billion dollars. On 16 September 2023 Marcroft was ranked fifth place on New Zealand First's party list and stood in the Kaipara ki Mahurangi electorate.

=== Second term, 2023–2026 ===
During the 2023 election, Marcroft came fourth place in the Kaipara ki Mahurangi electorate, gaining 2,531 votes. However, she was re-elected to Parliament on the NZ First party list. NZ First reentered Parliament, with 6.08% of the popular vote and eight seats.

Following the formation of the National-led coalition government, she assumed the position of Parliamentary Under-Secretary to the Minister for Media and Communications.

On 29 January 2024, Marcroft assumed the position of Parliamentary Under-Secretary to the Minister for Oceans and Fisheries.

In early June 2025, she and National Party MP Greg Fleming received a delegation outside Parliament carrying the 90,000-strong Pawprint Petition calling for a ban on the public sale of fireworks.

In April 2026, Marcroft's member's bill defining men and women according to their biological sex was drawn from the private member's ballot. The proposed Legislation (Definitions of Woman and Man) Amendment Bill would amend the Legislation Act 2019 to define a woman as an "adult human biological female" and man as "adult human biological male." The member's bill was the result of two petitions including one coordinated by the conservative Christian advocacy group Family First New Zealand. Lawyers Graeme Edgeler and Matt McKillop regarded the proposed bill as unnecessary since existing New Zealand legislation already permitted sex-segregated facilities and sex-differentiated sports. The opposition Green Party rainbow issues spokesperson Kahurangi Carter condemned the proposed bill as harmful to the transgender community while Justice Minister Paul Goldsmith said that the bill was not a priority for the National-led coalition government. Family First founder Bob McCoskrie expressed support for the proposed bill, saying that it could be refined at the select committee stage. The bill passed its first reading on 20 May 2026. During the first reading, Marcroft argued that the bill would deliver "clarity and consistency" and said that progressive politics had "prioritised ideology over biology."

=== Third term, 2026–present ===
During the 2026 New Zealand general election scheduled for 7 November, Marcroft contested the Kaipara ki Mahurangi electorate for New Zealand First. She was ranked 10th place on NZ First's party list. On 7 November, Marcroft with 2,753 votes based on preliminary results. She was re-elected to Parliament on the NZ First party list.
