= Office of Film and Literature Classification (disambiguation) =

Office of Film and Literature Classification may refer to:

- Office of Film and Literature Classification (Australia), was an Australian statutory classification and censorship authority which oversaw the Australian Classification Board
- Office of Film and Literature Classification (New Zealand), a New Zealand government agency responsible for the classification of all films, videos, publications, and some video games within the country.
