= Society for Promotion of Community Standards =

Lobby group in New Zealand

The Society for Promotion of Community Standards Inc. ("SPCS") is a conservative lobby group in New Zealand. A registered charity and incorporated society, the Society has taken a strong pro-censorship stance and clashed many times with the Office of Film and Literature Classification. They have also advocated socially conservative positions on issues such as abortion, euthanasia and same-sex marriage.

== History ==
The society was founded in 1970 by Patricia Bartlett, a former nun of the Roman Catholic Order of the Sisters of Mercy. She retired from the organisation in 1996. Membership of SPCS rose to a peak of 25,000 in the 1970s. Since then, membership numbers have declined to the present steady level of about 400.

The current president is John Mills, businessman and Elder of the Kapiti Christian Fellowship, and the executive director is David Lane. Lane is the most active figure in the society, researching current issues in New Zealand society with the information gathered being used for press releases and submissions.

== Patrons ==
- Eric Gowing 1971-1980
- Edward Musgrave Blaiklock 1971-1983
- Dove-Myer Robinson 1971-1976
- Charles Ritchie Burns 1973-1984
- Dean Goffin 1982-1983
- D.H. Campbell 1984-1987
- Trevor Young 1987 – 1995
- Desmond Sullivan LLB 1987-
- John Kennedy-Good, 1984-2005
- Marilyn Pryor 2005-2008
- T.V. O'Donnell, 2008-

== Activities ==
Initially, the organisation campaigned against pornography in films, videos and magazines. However, Howley v Lawrence Publishing [1986] (Court of Appeal) initiated a string of anti-censorship court and regulatory decisions that came to rely on evidence-based social scientific proof for censorship policy decisions. This culminated in passage of the Films, Videos and Publications Classification Act 1993, and marginalised their campaign.

The SPCS has issued media releases opposing civil unions, hate speech bans, the repeal of section 59 of the Crimes Act, and the decriminalisation of sex work. The SPCS had repeatedly criticised Bill Hastings, while he was New Zealand's Chief Censor, the Office of Film and Literature Classification (OFLC), and the Film and Literature Board of Review for what it believes to be their liberal application of censorship law. In 2001 SPCS submitted a number of film festival items to the Film and Literature Board of Review for reclassification, including the French film Baise-Moi. It contended the film should be banned, as it was by Australian censors. The campaign was initially successful, although after several appeals this film subsequently went on to general commercial release. The SPCS has also sought permanent bans of the films Kill Bill, Irreversible, Visitor Q, Bully, Ken Park, Anatomie de l'enfer, Twentynine Palms, Y Tu Mama Tambien, 9 Songs and The Piano Teacher, again on the basis of what the SPCS believed was their objectionable sexual and violent content. It has not succeeded in obtaining permanent bans of any of the above, however. In 2005, the SPCS unsuccessfully sought an R18 classification of the computer game Playboy: The Mansion.

The SPCS applied for a review of the rating of The Passion of the Christ reduced to permit its exhibition to children provided they were accompanied by a parent despite criticisms of the film's graphic violence. This stance was criticised as being weak or even hypocritical. As a result of a review brought by Hoyts, the distributor of The Passion of the Christ, the film's classification was reduced from R16 to R15, which meant that most fifth-form (15-year-old) students could view it.

Since 1995, the SPCS has taken sixteen appeals to the Film and Literature Board of Review and succeeded in three of them. In 1995 the SPCS succeeded in having one pornographic video banned and in 1996 it had scenes cut from another on appeal. Since then every appeal that the SPCS has sought has resulted in the same or a lower classification. Ironically, former Chief Censor Bill Hastings, whom the SPCS campaigned to remove from Office, was a member of the Board that allowed the two successful appeals.

In 2006 the SPCS began to criticise the financial management of the OFLC. It complained to the Auditor General that the OFLC was inefficient and mismanaged taxpayer funds. The Auditor General dismissed the SPCS's complaint, stating that "no evidence of waste was found during the course of the audit" of the OFLC.

SPCS is also strongly opposed to the promotion of equal rights for lesbians and gays. In 2000, the Court of Appeal of New Zealand ruled that the Films, Videos, and Publications Classification Act 1993 could not be interpreted to ban two American anti-gay videos produced by Jeremiah Films. The SPCS was not the originator of the appeal over the videos but was a strong supporter of the Court's decision.

In 2011, the SPCS submitted Bruce LaBruce's gay horror film LA Zombie to the Film and Literature Board of Review for reclassification. The Board President, Dr Don Mathieson agreed with the SPCS that the film should be reclassified "objectionable" due to its major focus on graphic, gratuitous and offensive depictions of necrophilia - and other "sexual or physical conduct of a degrading or demeaning nature" and thereby banned. However, the remaining four Board members upheld the original R18 classification. Subsequently, the film was screened at Out Takes/Real Queer Film Festival run by Real Queer Inc in Auckland and Wellington.

== See also ==
- Censorship in New Zealand

== Bibliography ==
- New Zealand Administrative Reports (NZAR). The NZAR contain tribunal and court decisions related to New Zealand censorship law (1984- ).
- Paul Christoffel: Censored: A short history of censorship in New Zealand:Department of Internal Affairs: Wellington: 1989: ISBN 0-477-05633-4
- Carolyn Moynihan: A Stand for Decency: Patricia Bartlett and the Society for Promotion of Community Standards: SPCS: Upper Hutt: 1995: ISBN 0-473-03340-2 (This is a biographical work related to the life of the late SPCS Secretary Patricia Bartlett, including much detail about relevant censorship policy and law from her organisation's perspective.)
