= Family First New Zealand =

Conservative Christian lobby group

- Whānau Tahi Aotearoa
- Logo of Family First
- Formation: 2006; 20 years ago
- Founder: Bob McCoskrie
- Founded at: Auckland
- Type: Nonprofit NGO
- Legal status: Trust
- Purpose: Influencing public policy affecting families.
- Headquarters: Manukau, Auckland
- Region served: New Zealand
- National Director: Bob McCoskrie
- Key people: Board of Reference: Ian and Mary Grant, Sue and Jim Hickey, Nick and Vasa Tuitasi, Stu and Chris Hight, Dr Mary Daly and Chris Martin, Anthony and Shannon Samuels, Tony and Kay Jurgeleit
- Website: https://familyfirst.org.nz
- Remarks: Conservative Christian lobby group
- Formerly called: Family First Lobby

Family First New Zealand is a conservative Christian lobby group in New Zealand. It was founded in March 2006 by former Radio Rhema talkback radio host and South Auckland social-worker Bob McCoskrie, who continues to be its National Director.

Family First have been described as "New Zealand's most formidable conservative campaigners", and have campaigned to influence public policy in a number of areas, including lobbying against abortion, binge drinking, cervical cancer vaccines, drug decriminalisation, gambling, pornography, prostitution, comprehensive sex education in schools, and issues affecting LGBTQ rights.

Family First lost its charitable status in 2022, after its removal by the Charities Registration Board was upheld in the Supreme Court. In its decision, the court ruled Family First's activities were not charitable due to their lack of "fairness, balance, and respect", and that its published research lacked the balance needed to be educational.

== Background ==
Family First was founded in March 2006 by Bob McCoskrie, a former church leader and talkback host on Radio Rhema who serves as its National Director, with the objective to "seek to influence public policy affecting the rights and protection of families and promote a culture that values the family".

McCoskrie founded the group out of a "burning need" to be vocal on certain issues. He denied the group was funded or influenced by international groups, but acknowledged links to the local branch of Focus on the Family, an American fundamentalist group. Within its first two-year, the group received almost $410,000 in donations from groups and individuals, and had put out over 200 press releases.

Family First rose to prominence in 2007, during their campaign against Sue Bradford's "anti-smacking bill" and its subsequent referendum; Paul Morris, a religious studies professor at Victoria University, said the group had "successfully broaden[ed] the Christian agenda in New Zealand politics in a way never seen before".

=== Loss of charitable status ===
Family First was established by a trust deed under the Charitable Trusts Act 1957 in 2006 and was registered as a charity in 2007. In 2010, it was granted continued charity status following a review.

In May 2013, the independent Charities Registration Board determined the group did not "further religion or education, nor promote a benefit to all New Zealanders" and held that Family First did not qualify for charitable status. In its media statement and within the online copy of its decision, the Charities Registration Board held that Family First's objectives were primarily political and not the provision of social, educational or other charitable services as defined under the Charities Act 2005.

McCoskrie challenged the decision, saying it was a ploy to "shut them up" and argued that their opposition to same-sex marriage had been the reason for their de-registration. He expressed concern about the group's future if the de-registration remained in place, including their income tax exemption and donations to Family First no longer qualifying for a rebate. On 30 June 2015, in response to an appeal lodged by Family First, the High Court directed the Charities Registration Board to reconsider the case, in light of a recent Supreme Court decision that recognised Greenpeace political advocacy as a charitable act.

On 21 August 2017, the Charities Registration Board released its reconsideration and again decided that Family First did not qualify for charitable status on the grounds that the group's activities could not be classified as being charitable for the public benefit. On 30 April 2018, the High Court in Wellington heard Family First's second appeal, and released its decision on 7 September 2018 to uphold the Charity Board's decision.

The revocation was later overturned on 27 August 2020 by the Court of Appeal, who ruled in Family First's favour. In mid December 2020, the Attorney General David Parker, appealed the Court of Appeal's ruling to the Supreme Court.

On 28 June 2022 the Supreme Court ruled that Family First did not qualify for charitable status, concluding that its research lacked the balance needed to be educational. The Supreme Court also held that group's activities were not charitable on the grounds that it lacked "fairness, balance, and respect."

==== Responses to the Supreme Court's decision ====
Charities researcher Dr Michael Gousmett welcomed the Supreme Court's ruling on the grounds that Family First discriminated against some people, Charities Law director Sue Barker expressed concern that the revocation of Family First's charitable status could set a precedent for targeting charities with dissenting views. Barker also called on the New Zealand Government to clearly define charitable purposes as part of their review of the Charities Act. Before forming a Government in October 2017, both New Zealand Labour and Green parties had said they would reform the Act by "updating and widening rather than narrowing the definition of charitable purposes" so that NGOs would be "encouraged rather than penalised for their advocacy". The bill to revise the act is expected to be introduced in 2022.

== Views and activities ==
=== Electoral campaigning ===
Family First has produced "Value Your Vote", a brochure and accompanying website which were voting guides primarily concerned with each party's or candidate's record and opinions on issues which it saw affecting the family, such as civil unions, same-sex marriage, prostitution, brothels, abortion, unborn child rights, embryonic stem cell research, anti-smacking, gender identity, abstinence-based sex education, parental notification, palliative care, public indecency, drinking age, alcohol outlets, Easter trading, loan sharks, gambling, welfare vouchers, affordable housing, GST on rates, facilities for families, paid parental leave, assisted suicide and euthanasia, medicinal and recreational cannabis and decriminalisation of all drugs. The guides were published for the 2008 general election, the 2010 Auckland mayoral election, the 2011 general election, the 2013 Auckland mayoral election, the 2014 general election, the 2017 general election, the 2020 general election, the 2023 general election, and the 2026 general election.

100,000 of the guides were printed and distributed in 2023.

=== Smacking referendum ===
In 2007, Family First supported a petition for a citizens-initiated referendum to overturn the 2007 amendment act which replaced Section 59 of the Crimes Act 1961, which had allowed for a defence of reasonable force in child abuse cases based on corporal punishment. The petition gained 324,316 signatures although only 285,027 were required for a referendum. When checked for invalid signatures there was a shortfall of 15,000 signatures. Sufficient signatures were then obtained, and a postal ballot taking place between 30 July and 21 August 2009. Family First criticised the decision to spend $8 million on the postal ballot, rather than including it in the 2008 General Election or simply amending the law.

The referendum's wording, "Should a smack as part of good parental correction be a criminal offence in New Zealand?", was criticised by many for being confusing and poorly worded, and that using a value-judgement like "good" before "parental correction" was leading.

Voter turnout for the referendum was 56.1%. Despite a result of 87.4% voting "no", the Government said they did not intend to change the law.

In 2016, the group published a report saying that the law had "failed to reduce child abuse"; former-MP Sue Bradford, ridiculed the report for suggesting that a "law to protect children from physical violence [would] solve the problem of child violence".

=== Pornography and censorship of explicit media ===
==== Pornography ====
In 2010, after Minister Shane Jones controversially admitted to using his ministerial credit card for pornographic films, Family First wrote about what it viewed as the damaging effects of pornography on families and marriages, and promoted research showing negative effects of children being exposed to pornography.

In 2015, it petitioned to have lad magazine Zoo Weekly banned from Countdown supermarket shelves, picking up a campaign in Australia targeting Countdown's parent company Woolworths.

In 2017, Family First presented a 22,000 written signature petition to Parliament against pornography, promoted research showing the harmful effects of porn being a public health issue, and called for an investigation into the destructive effects of pornography. The media reported that the petition even had the support of "outspoken left-wing feminist parliamentarians".

==== Into the River ====
On 6 September 2015, Family First successfully appealed a decision by New Zealand's classification office to lift an R14 restriction on the New Zealand author Ted Dawe's Into the River, a young adult novel about a Māori youth named Te Arepa Santos' experiences at an Auckland boarding school. Since its publication in 2012, Into the River had drawn controversy for its explicit description of sex, drugs, and coarse language. As a result of the appeal, the book was placed under an interim restriction order under New Zealand's Films, Videos and Publications Classification Act 1993, banning it completely from being sold or supplied in New Zealand. This was the first time a book had been banned in New Zealand in 22 years.

Family First's actions were criticised by Dawe, the book's publisher Penguin Random House, poet C. K. Stead, and several librarians as amounting to censorship. In response to public criticism, McCoskrie asserted that his organisation had not called for the book to be banned but had merely wanted censors to reinstate the book's R14 rating and require that copies of the book carry a warning sticker. In addition, McCoskrie also called for a wider film-like sticker rating system for books citing parental concerns and age appropriateness. Family First also claimed that the Classification Office had received 400 letters about the book from concerned parents. In a press statement, Family First also argued that the New Zealand Bill of Rights stated that "freedom of expression" and "freedom to access information" did not trump censorship laws aimed at protecting the "public good".

On 14 October 2015, the Film and Literature Board lifted the interim ban on Into the River; ruling by a majority that while aspects of the book were offensive it did not merit an age restriction. In response, McCoskrie accused the board of succumbing to book industry pressure despite what he alleged was the book's "highly offensive and gratuitous language, adult themes and graphic sexual content".

=== LGBTQ Issues ===
==== Same-sex marriage opposition ====
In July 2012, Family First established "Protect Marriage", a website set up to oppose the legal recognition of same-sex marriage in New Zealand after Louisa Wall's private member's bill was drawn from the ballot. In January 2013, Family First presented a petition with 72,000 signatures to Parliament opposing same-sex marriage. Although multiple polling showed majority support in favour of the bill, Family First said a final poll they commissioned before the passage of the bill showed the country was split on the issue, and that their campaign had swayed public opinion.

McCoskrie resigned as a legal marriage celebrant at the end of 2013 in protest of the new law.

==== Anti-transgender campaigns ====
Family First have run a number of campaigns advocating against transgender rights in New Zealand, and have been accused of transphobia by many LGBTQ advocates.

In 2017, Family First launched a campaign called "AskMeFirst" to stop transgender women using female-only facilities like toilets and changing rooms. Family First drew media attention when it released a video entitled "Ask Me First About School Toilet Privacy: Laura" which focused on a high school girl and her mother's opposition to a transgender student using the female toilets at her school. Tranzaction and RainbowYouth criticised Family First for promoting transphobia.

In 2018, Family First objected to the New Zealand Government's proposal to ease the process for changing one's gender on their birth certificate. While applicants wanting to change the gender on their birth certificate then had to go through a lengthy process in the Family Court, the Government proposed a simple statutory declaration. Family First Director McCoskrie claimed that changing birth certificates would promote "unscientific gender ideology" and tell medical professionals "that they got it wrong at time of birth." In 2021, the Births, Deaths, Marriages, and Relationships Registration Act 2021 became law and allows people to change the sex or gender on their birth certificates without having to physically change their sex. It also allows the guardian of a child under 16 to change their child's nominated sex, and 16 or 17-year olds to change their nominated sex by statutory declaration without the consent of their legal guardian.

Prior to the 2023 general election, Family First launched a campaign and website centred around the question "What is a woman?" with an online petition asking "that 'woman' is to be defined as 'an adult human female' in all our laws, public policies and regulations". Conservative groups criticised the decision by three media outlets to not run full-page newspaper ads from the campaign; political party NZ First said the outlets were curtailing freedom of speech.

The Advertising Standards Authority ruled that a complaint against a billboard from the campaign was "upheld in part" and "not upheld in part". They said the identity of the advertiser was not easily recognised, and that while some consumers would be offended by the ad it was not likely to cause harm or serious offence. Earlier in the year, following a similar question of UK Labour leader Keir Starmer, Prime Minister Chris Hipkins had struggled to answer radio host Sean Plunket's question to "define a woman".

During the mid-2020s, Family First sponsored a petition calling for Parliament to pass legislation defining gender based on biological sex. This petition was signed by 23,500 people. A Family First-sponsored poll conducted by Curia found a majority of responders favoured the proposed law change. In early April 2026, a private member's bill defining gender based on biological sex by New Zealand First MP Jenny Marcroft was drawn from the private member's ballot system.

=== Abortion law reform ===
In 2019, Family First opposed the Labour-led coalition government's new legislation to remove abortion from the Crimes Act 1961, to allow unrestricted access to abortion for the first 20 weeks of pregnancy and restricted access after 20 weeks. The group described the government's proposed legislation as "deeply anti-human rights." In March 2020 the Abortion Legislation Act 2020 decriminalised abortion and allows women to choose a termination up to 20 weeks into a pregnancy, and terminate after 20 weeks with approval of a qualified health professional.

In 2022, after the US Supreme Court repealed long-standing Supreme Court decision Roe vs Wade that guaranteed nationwide access to abortion, Family First said the anti-abortion movement would continue to push future governments to restrict abortion in New Zealand and that the US decision was a "huge encouragement" for activists.

=== Euthanasia and cannabis referendums ===
During the New Zealand general election 2020, separate referendums were held on the legalisation of euthanasia and recreational cannabis. Family First ran an extensive campaign in opposition to both issues, called "Know means No". The campaign included a 37-date national tour, and the distribution of 400,000 pamphlets.

In the results of the referendums, 65.1 percent of voters ratified the passage of the End of Life Choice Act 2019, whilst 50.71 percent of voters opposed the legalisation of recreational cannabis.

McCoskrie said that he was "pretty stoked" with the cannabis referendum results and that he believed New Zealanders "understood the perceived benefits of legalisation were not greater than the harms that were going to come on society".

After the referendums, Family First released research that they say showed a media bias existed in favour of cannabis legalisation. NewstalkZB radio broadcaster Mike Hosking repeated these figures, alleging that "36 percent of all headlines promoted yes, [and] 18 percent were for no", and that "the yes position was quoted twice as often as no".

== See also ==
- Christian politics in New Zealand
- Christian right
