= Censorship in New Zealand =

Censorship in New Zealand has been present since around 1850 and is currently managed by the Classification Office under the Films, Videos, and Publications Classification Act 1993.

Over the years, New Zealand has gone through many iterations of censorship legislation. What began in the 1850s as vague and weak legislation was repeatedly updated with each iteration of censorship legislation addressing perceived shortcomings of the previous legislation. Notable changes in New Zealand censorship legislation include the continued attempts to give an objective criterion for determining whether something should be censored and the establishment of a centralised body that handles most censorship matters. These iterations adapted New Zealand legislation to changing times, and moved censorship in New Zealand in a more liberal direction.

The Classification Office is the government agency that is currently responsible for classification of all films, videos, publications, and some video games in New Zealand. It was created by the aforementioned Films, Videos, and Publications Classification Act 1993 and is an independent Crown entity. The head of the Office is called the Chief Censor, maintaining a title that has described the government officer in charge of censorship in New Zealand since 1916.

== Censorship legislation (1850–present) ==
=== Early acts ===
The Obscene Publications Act 1857 was one of the earliest censorious acts in New Zealand. Aimed at "works written with the single purpose of corrupting the morals of youth and of nature calculated to shock the common feeling of decency in any well regulated mind", it laid out a process by which obscene works could be destroyed, but did not explicitly define what could be considered an obscene work under law. This was followed by Vagrant Act of 1866 and the Police Offences Act of 1884, which both lightly contributed to censorship legislation. Both of these acts focused on banning the display of obscene media in public, but did not give much precision to the definition of "obscene".

The later Offensive Publications Act of 1892 was passed to formalise some of the legal procedure surrounding such cases, but the act contained major loopholes that made it difficult to actually prosecute someone under it. This act was in part targeted at reducing the spread of advertisements for fraudulent medical practices, which had become common by the 1880s.

Early censorship was enforced by allowing postmasters to open and dispose of mail that they thought contained material in need of censorship. This power was given to them by the Post Office Acts Amendment Act of 1893.

=== Indecent Publications Act 1910 ===
The Indecent Publications Act 1910 was one of New Zealand's earlier pieces of legislation regarding censorship, and remained in effect until it was repealed in 1963 by the Indecent Publications Act 1963. Its aim was in part to shore up some of the weaknesses of the aforementioned 1892 act. Notably, the act allowed for more aggressive law enforcement when it came to searching for and seizing indecent material and introduced a set of guidelines for determining whether something was indecent or not. That said, it did not explicitly define the term "indecent" and the Hicklin Rule was often applied by courts evaluating censorship cases.

A centralised censoring body did not exist at the time of this act's passing, and a good amount of censorship during the lifespan of this act was done by the Minister of Customs. Due to a close relationship between the Customs Act 1913 and the Indecent Publications Act 1910, the Comptroller of Customs was able to seize material that they considered to be indecent "within the meaning of the Indecent Publications Act", effectively censoring it. Notably, Forever Amber was censored by this method.

Beginning in 1945, the censorship method put in place by the aforementioned interaction between the Customs Act and the Indecent Publications Act began to draw concern from the public and from groups like the New Zealand Library Association that had a particular stake in censorship. The main concerns were with the suitability of the people who passed judgement on whether a book would be censored or not and with the absence of clear, objective criteria or guidelines for determining whether something should be censored or not. This public furor was in part triggered due to the somewhat arbitrary censorship of Forever Amber. In response to this concern, a committee led by Ian Gordon was established in 1953 to review and provide advice on whether a book should be censored. However, this committee had very little power, and it was not mandatory for the Customs Department to consult the committee or to listen to its recommendations. Eventually, the Customs Department stopped consulting this committee entirely.

In 1960 the novel Lolita by Vladimir Nabokov was banned by the Court of Appeal of New Zealand under this act. This decision was made based on an interpretation of the clause "unduly emphasizing matters of sex" as meaning "dealing with matters of sex in a manner which offends against the standards of the community in which the article is published". Eventually, the book was judged to be indecent on the basis that it "would have a tendency to corrupt or deprave a class of readers not negligible in number", despite its literary merit.

=== Indecent Publications Act 1963 ===
The passage of the Indecent Publications Act 1963 brought with it great changes to censorship in New Zealand. The Act was designed to react to the problems of the prior Act and notably it moved the responsibility for classifying books and sound recordings from the courts to a committee of experts. However, the classification of other forms of media, including photographs, remained the jurisdiction of the courts. The Act also sought to correct the drawbacks of the old evaluation procedure by formulating more objective criteria, ensuring that a book was evaluated by experts, defining "indecent" in stronger terms, and allowing for a range of judgement beyond just "decent" and "indecent". The Act allowed for the re-submission of books or other media, and in doing so allowed New Zealand censors to adapt to changing times.

The committee of experts established by the Act was known as the Indecent Publications Tribunal, and it acted as the main censoring body for New Zealand until the passage of the Films, Videos, and Publications Classification Act 1993. The committee consisted of five members, and at least two members were required to have significant expertise in the fields of literature of education. Beginning in March 1964, the Tribunal was responsible for examining books and audio media and classifying them based on the criteria outlined in the act. The Indecent Publications Tribunal was not all-powerful and could only rule on publications that had first been submitted to it.

The Indecent Publications Tribunal was notably responsible for the reclassification of the book Lolita in 1964 as 'not indecent', thus allowing for the legal purchase of the book. The decision to overturn the judgement made under the 1910 Act was made in consideration of the new definition of "indecent" in the 1963 Act, under which the literary merit of the work was to be considered in the Tribunal's decision. This judgement ultimately passed with 3 assenting members and 1 dissenting member who viewed the book as perverse and of no exceptional merit. This dissenting voice came from Judge A. P. Blair, the then chair of the Tribunal, who called for the book to be restricted to those over the age of 18.

While this Act centralised censorship to an extent, the Customs Department still played a large role in enforcing censorship. Much like they could under the 1910 Act, the Customs Department was still able to seize material that it considered offensive. These seizures were only contestable if disputed, in which case the matter would be referred to the Indecent Publications Tribunal.

This Act was notably criticised by the Society for Promotion of Community Standards (SPCS), which was founded by conservative Catholic pro-censorship activist Patricia Bartlett in 1971. The SPCS took issue with some of the more liberal decisions of the Indecent Publications Tribunal and opposed most sexual content. Their activism aided the passage of a 1972 amendment that introduced some controversial changes.

=== Homosexual Law Reform Act 1986 ===
After Parliament passed the Homosexual Law Reform Act 1986, New Zealand censorship regulatory bodies could not rely on previous case law and Tribunal decisions based on the illegality of sex between men. Later that same year, in Howley v Lawrence Publishing, the Court of Appeal found that censorship regulators should base their decisions on social scientific and medical research.

During the 1980s and 1990s, an increasingly proactive LGBT New Zealand community fought several test cases that expanded Howley's precedent to encompass all government censorship regulatory bodies. The Society for Promotion of Community Standards lost all of these cases, whether before the Indecent Publications Tribunal, High Court, Court of Appeal, or the later Classification Office.

Today, most lesbian and gay erotic media that contains sexual imagery is labelled R18, available only to those eighteen years of age and over. While fetishist erotic media is similarly regulated, any media that is considered to promote or support paedophilia, necrophilia, zoophilia, coprophilia, urophilia, or drug manufacture information is prohibited in New Zealand.

=== Films, Videos, and Publications Classification Act 1993 ===
The passage of the Films, Videos, and Publications Classification Act 1993 merged the previously separate Indecent Publications Tribunal, Chief Censor of Films, and the Video Recordings Authority into a single agency, the Classification Office. This agency presides over censorship in New Zealand to this day.

In addition to the Office, the Film & Literature Board of Review, made up of 9 experts, was established as the agency that presides over the appeals process for decisions made by the Office. The Board of Review handles appeals made within 28 working days of the original decisions. Any later appeals must be made at least three years from the original decision and are evaluated by the Office itself.

Under this Act, films, videos, DVDs, and video games have to go through the Office for classification and labelling, while books, magazines, music, and newspapers are only processed when a complaint it raised about them by a third party. While it was always mandatory for a film to have a physical label displaying its classification, similar rules for print media were not put into place until 2005, where an amendment to the Act required that print media given a restricted classification have a physical label denoting this classification.

The Office receives very few classification requests for printed media; only 25 items were classified in 2007.

=== Criminal Procedure Act 2011 ===
In New Zealand, name suppression is the commonly used term for a court order preventing the publication of a name or details of a criminal case. The rules for name suppression are laid out in the Criminal Procedure Act 2011. Name suppression can be granted automatically for several reasons, including to protect the identities of victims of sex crimes or to protect the identity of children under the age of 17. Name suppression can also be granted at the discretion of the court. Defendants frequently receive name suppression in New Zealand. Often this is due to the court determining that media coverage could cause undue hardship to a defendant, or could prejudice the defendant's right to a fair trial. Name suppression orders can be (and frequently are) opposed, often by media outlets. Victims of crime can waive their automatic name suppression rights, in order to lift name suppression on the defendant, though this is uncommon. In theory, a defendant being well-known is not in-and-of-itself grounds for name suppression, though in practice many well-known people are granted name suppression when charged with a crime.

Breaching a name suppression order brings a penalty of up to 6 months in prison for individuals, or fines of up to NZ$100,000 for organisations.

Some high-profile cases have seen breaches of name suppression orders in New Zealand. In 2010, right-wing blogger and vocal critic of name suppression rules Cameron Slater was convicted of breaching name suppression orders and fined NZ$8,000. Later, Slater himself benefited from name suppression when charged with attempting to hack a competing political website.

The defendant in the murder of Grace Millane was granted name suppression during trial, but media outlets covering the case in the United Kingdom published his name, as they were not subject to New Zealand law. This resulted in his name being commonly available online in New Zealand, including being emailed to Google News subscribers within New Zealand. Auckland businessman Leo Molloy was convicted of breaching name suppression in the case when he posted the defendant's name on a web forum. He was fined NZ$15,000 and sentenced to 350 hours of community service.

In August 2023 Te Pāti Māori co-leader Rawiri Waititi made a direct reference to a child abuse case involving former ACT party president Tim Jago in parliament. Despite details of the case being suppressed from publication by the courts, Waititi's speech was protected by parliamentary privilege. He was later suspended from parliament for breaching standing orders.

Name suppression orders can be quite broad. In 2025, former deputy New Zealand Police commissioner Jevon McSkimming was charged with possession of child sexual exploitation and bestiality material. Prior to being charged, McSkimming was granted a "super-injunction", that prevented the media reporting the nature of the material that had been discovered on his work devices, and also prevented reporting about the existence of the injunction itself. Before he was arrested, he was again granted a suppression order that prevented media reporting that he had been arrested, or the nature of the crimes he was accused of. Suppression lapsed before trial, and his identity was revealed.

Name suppression laws in New Zealand have been controversial since they were first introduced in the early 20th century, and specific suppression orders are also sometimes highly controversial. Critics point to the legislation being used to protect the identities of well-known figures when they are accused of crime, and that suppressing details from publication conflicts with the principle of open justice. The internet has introduced new challenges with the enforcement of name suppression orders. The New Zealand Bar Association has defended name suppression laws as an important tool for balancing the principles of open justice against fair trial rights.

In 2025, a law change was proposed that would allow the victims of sex crimes to have final say over whether a convicted perpetrator would receive permanent name suppression.

== Censorship by medium ==
=== Film censorship ===
The advent of film as a commonly consumed form of media brought with it a strong push for legislation that would be able to regulate it. The period between 1909 and 1915 saw requests for film regulation come from many different sources, and these culminated in the Cinematograph-film Censorship Act 1916. This Act introduced a national film censor, who was given full jurisdiction over film censorship and who aimed to censor media in order to "protect the public mind, especially children, against things that may do them harm".

This Act remained in place until 1928, when it was replaced by the Cinematograph Films Act 1928. This Act combined the previous act with several amendments, consolidating all of them into one new piece of legislation. Notably, this act included a letter grade system of classification and the extension of the film censors power to encompass advertising material for films.

This letter grade system was expanded upon by Chief Censor of Films Gordon Miriams, who introduced a set of restriction labels in 1950.

Under these Acts, the Chief Censor of Films was given full discretion when it came to censoring films, and was able to arbitrarily cut and approve films based on the particular film censor's beliefs. Particularly telling are the criticisms of Douglas McIntosh, Chief Censor between 1970 and 1974, whose critics contested that "the law allowed him to do anything he liked" when it came to censorship. This remained the case until 1976 when the Cinematograph Films Act was passed. This Act removed this discretionary ability and stated that a film must only be censored if it was "injurious to the public good". The Act defined some criteria to use when considering whether a film would be injurious to the public good and in doing so provided for a more objective system of film censorship.

Since the passage of the Films, Videos, and Publications Classification Act 1993, film censorship is, like all other censorship, currently governed by the Classification Office.

Diplomats from China have twice called upon the Auckland University of Technology to suppress film screenings that were critical of the Chinese government. AUT declined in both cases, although an event commemorating the 1989 Tiananmen Square protests and massacre was unable to proceed due to a conflict with the Queen's Official Birthday holiday.

=== Theatre ===
Theatre does not appear to be a medium that has been actively censored and there are relatively few instances of attempted theatre censorship in New Zealand.

=== Internet censorship ===
New Zealand actively monitors and censors its citizens' usage of the internet. Since 2010 New Zealand Internet service providers (ISPs) have engaged in the filtering of web requests to any site on a non-public blacklist. This filtering only applies if the user received Internet service from an ISP which has elected to participate in the filtering.

=== Video games ===
Video games in New Zealand are subject to censorship under the 1993 Act. They are evaluated by the Classification Office under the same criteria as all publications. In addition, some degree of self censorship has been practiced by the NZ video game industry.

In 2003 Manhunt became the first video game to be banned by the Office. The extremely graphic nature of the game led the Office to consider it injurious to the public good, and garnered the game a classification of "objectionable". In particular, the Office pointed out that the game rewarded players for particularly brutal killings and forcing the player to kill to progress the story over a non-trivial length of time. In 2023 the Office reconsidered Manhunt and classified it R18.

Since Manhunt, several more games have been banned.

=== Book censorship ===
Book censorship has existed in New Zealand since at least 1858, when Customs regulations came into force that prohibited the importation of material that was considered indecent. As of September 2011, 1319 books have been banned and an additional 728 have been restricted in some way.

== Notable cases ==
=== 1900–2000 ===
1922 saw New Zealand experience its first and only attempt to prosecute someone for blasphemy. John Glover was brought to trial in 1922 for the inclusion of the poem "Stand To: Good Friday Morning" by Siegfried Sassoon in a 1921 issue of The Maoriland Worker. This prosecution was brought forth due to the belief that the last three lines of the poem contained blasphemous libel, due to supposedly indecent use of religious imagery. John Glover was found not guilty by the jury, but it was noted in a rider that "similar publications of such literature be discouraged". Section 123 of the Crimes Act was repealed in 2019, making this the only prosecution.

In 1930, the film All Quiet on the Western Front was banned in New Zealand as anti-war propaganda. It was eventually allowed to be shown with a few cuts made.

The Censorship and Publicity Regulations were passed in 1939 and were used to prevent the dissemination of information deemed contrary to the national interest during World War II. For example, the newspaper of the Communist Party of New Zealand, The People's Voice, was seized in 1940. The Battle of Manners Street in 1943 was a riot involving American and New Zealand servicemen. No report of the event was permitted in local newspapers.

During the 1951 waterfront dispute, it was illegal to publish material in support of the watersiders or their allies.

The film Ulysses based on the novel by James Joyce was rated R21 in 1967 and only screened to segregated audiences because of its use of the word "fuck". The "segregated audience" condition was lifted in 1972 and the film's rating was downgraded to R18. In the 1990s its classification was downgraded to M for mature audiences over 16.

=== 2000–present ===
In 2000 a complaint was made against two Christian videos that purportedly represented homosexuals and bisexuals as inferior. The case was upheld. Family First New Zealand have called for the banning of violent video games, most notably Grand Theft Auto IV.

The film Baise-moi, which contained violence and unsimulated sex by the actors, was the subject of a number of complaints laid by the Society for the Promotion of Community Standards. After an extended classification and appeal process, the film was ultimately classified as R18 by the Court of Appeal in 2003 and restricted to theatrical exhibition or exhibition to students in tertiary media or film studies courses.

Under the 1993 Classification Act, all printed material is subject to censorship, including clothing. In 2007 a T-shirt that advertised an album for British extreme metal band Cradle of Filth was banned by Chief Censor Bill Hastings. According to Hastings, it was one of the most graphic T-shirts he had ever seen. The shirt displayed an image of a semi-nude Roman Catholic nun masturbating along with the text "Jesus is a cunt". In 2020 the Office reconsidered the classification of the shirt and re-classified it R18.

In 2008 The Peaceful Pill Handbook, a book setting out information on assisted suicide and voluntary euthanasia, was banned by the Office. In May 2008 an edited version of the book was allowed for sale if sealed and an indication of the censorship classification was displayed. Its authors Philip Nitschke and Fiona Stewart had removed content that might have directly assisted the suicide of others, which is an offence under New Zealand's Crimes Act 1961.

In 2014, the 2010 Queenstown suppressed indecency case gave rise to a discussion over the use of suppression orders protecting celebrities when a member of the New Zealand Parliament, Maggie Barry, described a groping by Australian entertainer Rolf Harris during a studio interview she conducted in her previous broadcasting career. Retired parliamentarian Rodney Hide taunted her in a newspaper column, urging her to use her parliamentary privilege to breach the name suppression order.

Following a complaint from Family First New Zealand and the Society for Promotion of Community Standards, the book Into the River was placed under an interim restriction order in 2015 under the Films, Videos and Publications Classification Act 1993, prohibiting it from being sold or supplied until classification for it had been finalised. This decision was met with international criticism and scrutiny. The restriction order was eventually lifted in late 2015 after significant back and forth between the Office and the Board of Review. Into the River was initially given an M rating in 2013, and went through reclassification many times before the interim restriction order was placed and raised in 2015. The book is currently unrestricted.

In 2019, Radio New Zealand (RNZ) reported that Chief Censor David Shanks banned the distribution of the Christchurch mosque shooter's manifesto, saying that "others have referred to the publication as a 'manifesto'", but Shanks considers it a crude booklet which promotes murder and terrorism. RNZ wrote that "those who have the publication for legitimate purposes, such as reporters, researchers and academics to analyse and educate can apply for an exception" but that "according to the Department of Internal Affairs, knowingly possessing or sharing objectionable material carries up to a 14 year jail term". In response to the shooting, Minister of Justice Andrew Little initiated a review of existing hate speech laws with the goal of making them broader.

In October 2019, the Classification Office banned the downloading and distribution of the alleged German shooter Stephan Balliet's livestream of the Halle synagogue shooting. The Chief Censor David Shanks likened the video's content to the Christchurch shootings.

== Chief Censor ==
The Chief Censor is the chief executive officer and chairperson of the Classification Office. Kathryn Paterson was the first Chief Censor under the Films, Videos, and Publications Classification Act 1993. Bill Hastings was the Chief Censor from 1999 through to 2010 when he stood down to become a District Court Judge and Chair of the Immigration and Protection Tribunal. Deputy Chief Censor Nicola McCully filled the role until Dr Andrew Jack was appointed to the position for a three-year term starting in March 2011. David Shanks was appointed in 2017 and finished in the position in 2022. His successor is Caroline Flora.

Term		Chief Censor	Legislation
1	1916 – 1927	William Jolliffe	Cinematograph-film Censorship Act 1916
2	1927 – 1937	Walter Tanner	Cinematograph-film Censorship Act 1916
2	1927 – 1937	Walter Tanner	Cinematograph Films Act 1928
3	1938 – 1949	W. A. von Keisenberg	Cinematograph Films Act 1928
4	1949 – 1959	Gordon Mirams	Cinematograph Films Act 1928
5	1960 – 1976	Douglas McIntosh	Cinematograph Films Act 1928
5	1960 – 1976	Douglas McIntosh	Cinematograph Films Act 1976
6	1977 – 1983	Bernard Tunnicliffe	Cinematograph Films Act 1976
7	1984 – 1990	Arthur Everard	Films Act 1983
8	1991 – 1993	Jane Wrightson	Films Act 1983
9	18 April 1994 – 1998	Kathryn Paterson	Films, Videos, and Publications Classification Act 1993
10	October 1999 – July 2010	Bill Hastings	Films, Videos, and Publications Classification Act 1993
11	7 March 2011 – 6 March 2017	Andrew Jack	Films, Videos, and Publications Classification Act 1993
12	8 May 2017 – 6 May 2022	David Shanks	Films, Videos, and Publications Classification Act 1993
13	20 July 2022 – Incumbent	Caroline Flora	Films, Videos, and Publications Classification Act 1993

== See also ==
- Internet censorship in New Zealand
- List of books banned in New Zealand
