= Charities Act 2005 =

Act of Parliament in New Zealand

New Zealand Parliament
- Long title: The purpose of this Act is to— (a) establish the Commission as a Crown entity for the purposes of section 7 of the Crown Entities Act 2004: (b) state the Commission's functions and powers: (c) require the Commission— (i) to have regard to certain matters; and (ii) to comply with certain other obligations: (d) provide for the registration of societies, institutions, and trustees of trusts as charitable entities: (e) require charitable entities and certain other persons to comply with certain obligations.
- Administered by: Ministry of Social Development and the Department of Internal Affairs

Legislative history
- Passed: 2005
- Status: Current legislation

The Charities Act is an Act of Parliament passed in New Zealand in 2005. One of the functions of the Act was setting up the Charities Commission.

The Charities Act is administered by the Ministry of Social Development and the Department of Internal Affairs.

== See also ==
- Economy of New Zealand
