= Catherine Paterson =

Catherine Paterson may refer to:

- Katherine Paterson, American author
- Kathryn Paterson, Chief Censor of New Zealand

== See also ==
- Kathy Patterson, politician
- Katie Paterson, artist
