= Legislation (Definitions of Woman and Man) Amendment Bill =

Proposed Act of Parliament in New Zealand

New Zealand Parliament

Legislative history
- Introduced by: Jenny Marcroft
- Committee responsible: Social Services and Community
- First reading: 20 May 2026
- Status: Pending — before

The Legislation (Definitions of Woman and Man) Amendment Bill is a proposed act of Parliament that seeks to legally define the terms "man" and "woman" in New Zealand law. It is a member's bill that was introduced by New Zealand First Member of Parliament Jenny Marcroft. The Definitions of Woman and Man Amendment Bill passed its first reading on 20 May 2026.

== Key provisions ==
The Legislation (Definitions of Woman and Man) Amendment Bill seeks to amend the Legislation Act 2019 to provide "a clear and biologically grounded meaning of woman and man across New Zealand legislation". It inserts two new provisions into Section 13 of the Legislation Act:

- Section 13A defining a woman as an "adult human biological female"; and female as a "human biological female".
- Section 13B defining a man as an "adult human biological male"; and male as a "human biological male".

== Background ==
Following the 2023 New Zealand general election, the New Zealand First party entered into a coalition government with the National and ACT parties in late November 2023. On 10 May 2024, New Zealand First introduced its "Fair Access to Bathrooms Bill" into Parliament, which would require all public buildings to provide clearly demarcated unisex and single sex bathrooms. The proposed bill would also fine anyone using a single-sex toilet "who is not of the sex for which that toilet has been designated". The opposition New Zealand Labour Party leader Chris Hipkins and Green Party of Aotearoa New Zealand rainbow community spokesperson Kahurangi Carter described the member's bill as an attack on the transgender community.

In-mid April 2025, Radio New Zealand reported that New Zealand First had withdrawn its proposed bathroom bill. According to New Zealand First chief of staff Darroch Ball, the withdrawal of the "bathroom legislation" was part of the party's tactic of submitting, withdrawing and replacing member's bills as a means of "generating headlines". By mid-May 2026, The Spinoff estimated that the party had submitted 19 member's bills since the formation of the National-led coalition government in late 2024, despite the party only having four MPs who were eligible to submit them.

On 22 April 2025, the party's leader Winston Peters announced a new member's bill seeking to amend the Legislation Act 2019 to define the terms woman and man under New Zealand law as "an adult human biological female" and as "an adult human biological male" respectively. This member's bill was the result of two petitions including one coordinated by the conservative Christian advocacy group Family First New Zealand, whose founder and leader Bob McCoskrie expressed support for the proposed bill, saying that it could be refined at the select committee stage.

== Legislative history ==
=== Introduction ===
On 10 April 2026, New Zealand First MP Jenny Marcroft's member's bill defining men and women according to their biological sex was drawn from the New Zealand Parliament's private member's ballot. Lawyers Graeme Edgeler and Matt McKillop regarded the proposed bill as unnecessary since existing New Zealand legislation already permitted sex-segregated facilities and sex-differentiated sports. The Green Party's rainbow issues spokesperson Carter condemned the proposed bill as harmful to the transgender community, while Justice Minister Paul Goldsmith said that the bill was not a priority for the Sixth National Government.

On 20 May, the National and ACT parties confirmed that they would support the bill's passage to select committee level, with National's deputy leader Nicola Willis and ACT leader David Seymour saying there were two biological sexes. By contrast, the opposition Labour and Green parties confirmed they would vote against the bill, with Labour leader Chris Hipkins and Green co-leader Chlöe Swarbrick describing the gender bill as a distraction from "cost of living" and economic issues and an attack on transgender people respectively.

=== First reading ===
That same day, the bill passed its first reading along party lines, National, ACT and New Zealand First voting for the bill and Labour, Green and Te Pāti Māori (TPM) voting against it. The bill's sponsor Jenny Marcroft said that the bill would bring "clarity and consistency" when what it meant to be a woman was "under attack". Marcroft also referenced a Supreme Court of the United Kingdom 2025 ruling that the term "woman" referred to biological sex. Marcroft argued that the law change would combat "progressive politics prioritising ideology over biology". National Party MP Nicola Grigg questioned whether the bill would deliver its goals of advancing women's and girls' rights but said that National would support New Zealanders having a say on the bill at select committee level. ACT MP Karen Chhour said that ACT supported the bill because people were denying the biological differences between men and women. She said the debate was not about hate but about people being able to speak about sex-based rights without being "shamed into silence".

Labour MP Camilla Belich said the bill was hurtful to the transgender community and was unworkable because its inclusion of the word 'adult' would lead to discrimination on the basis of age. Fellow Labour MP Vanushi Walters said the bill would encourage hatred of the LGBTQ community and that the government should focus on the cost of living rather than "divisive" bills. Greens co-leader Swarbrick questioned the government's claim to care for women, citing its track record on removing pay equity rights and cutting funding to sexual violence prevention services. TPM MP Oriini Kaipara described the bill as harmful to transgender people and said that the Māori world did not differentiate between men and women.

=== Select committee stage ===
The bill was referred to Parliament's Social Services and Community Select Committee. Public submissions on the bill opened on 20 May and closed on 2 July 2026.

== Responses ==
=== Opposition ===
In early June 2026 the University of Otago's vice-chancellor Grant Robertson, a former Labour cabinet minister, criticised the Legislation (Definitions of Woman and Man) Amendment Bill in an email to the university community addressing student wellbeing and support services ahead of exams. He said "at a personal level, I find this legislation to be unnecessary and disturbing". In response, the New Zealand Free Speech Union's stakeholder relationships manager Steph Martin accused Robertson of breaching the University's policy of institutional neutrality. The University of Otago countered that Robertson had explicitly stated that his view on the proposed legislation was a "personal one" and was "clearly separated from the position of the university in supporting the wellbeing of students".

In mid-June 2026, St Matthew-in-the-City in Auckland Central erected a billboard urging members of the public to send submissions opposing the bill. The church's reverend, Richard Bonifant, opposed the bill, saying that it would cause "great harm" to transgender and intersex communities.

==== Protests ====
On 13 June 2026, about 10,000 LGBTQ-rights protesters opposing the bill gathered in five cities including Wellington. Following these protests, Winston Peters referred to protesters as "rent-a-crowd protestors" and refused to apologise when the activist group Rainbow Action Tāmaki asked him to. In response to the group's request for him to donate $100 to RainbowYOUTH, Peters further insulted the protesters and reiterated his stance that the bill is "about the rights, safety, and protection of women and girls".

On 21 June, about 1,000 LGBTQ protesters and supporters gathered in Dunedin's The Octagon in opposition to the bill.

=== Support ===
Women's rights lobby group Speak Up For Women supports the bill, stating that "New Zealand law urgently needs clear, biologically grounded definitions that recognise the reality and importance of sex". Family First also supports the bill, citing a poll they commissioned that shows most New Zealanders are in support. Another poll, conducted on behalf of the Women's Rights Party in May 2026, showed that support for the bill had increased amongst voters from all parties.
