= Charities Commission =

Charities Commission or Charity Commission may refer to:

- Australian Charities and Not-for-profits Commission
- Charities Commission (New Zealand), the former name of Charities Services
- Charity Commission for England and Wales, the non-ministerial government department that regulates registered charities in England and Wales
- Charity Commission for Northern Ireland, the independent regulator of Northern Ireland charities

== See also ==
- Office of the Scottish Charity Regulator, a non-ministerial department of the Scottish Government with responsibility for the regulation of charities in Scotland
