= New Zealand Office for the Community & Voluntary Sector =

New Zealand government agency responsible liaising with the non-profit sector

New Zealand Office for the Community & Voluntary Sector (OCVS)
- Tari mō te Rāngai ā-Hapori, ā-Tūao

Agency overview
- Formed: 2003
- Jurisdiction: New Zealand
- Minister responsible: Louise Upston, Minister for the Community and Voluntary Sector
- Parent agency: Department of Internal Affairs
- Website: http://www.ocvs.govt.nz

The New Zealand Office for the Community and Voluntary Sector (OCVS) was established in 2003. It was administered by the Ministry of Social Development until February 2011, when it became part of the Department of Internal Affairs.

== Purpose ==
The Office for the Community and Voluntary Sector's vision is for a strong community-government relationship. In practice, this means providing an accessible central contact point for government agencies in their work with the community and voluntary sector, and promoting good practice models between government agencies and their community sector partners.

== Work Programme ==
As well as providing advice to the Minister and Associate Minister for the Community and Voluntary Sector, the OCVS has five inter-related parts to its work programme:

- supporting work to build the capacity of the sector, such as funding the Community Sector Taskforce to undertake community-driven initiatives
- building knowledge about the community sector and volunteering, for example, work on the Study of the New Zealand Non-profit Sector that helped provide a clearer picture of the nature and extent of non-profit sector activity within New Zealand
- providing other government agencies with advice on overcoming policy barriers and addressing issues of concern to the community and voluntary sector
- actively supporting the development and promotion of good practice by government agencies when engaging with or funding the sector, for example through the ‘good practice in action’ seminar series.
- promoting generosity - the giving of time and money - such as working with Volunteering New Zealand to help promote International Volunteer Day and Volunteer Awareness Week, and with Inland Revenue to inform people about payroll giving.

== Some key facts about New Zealand’s non-profit sector: ==
- It has more than 97,000 non-profit organisations.
- New Zealand's non-profit sector contributes 2.6% to GDP.
- This increases to $6.95 billion (or 4.9% of GDP) when taking into account the volunteer labour contribution. (This is similar to the contribution of the entire construction industry.)
- The sector contains more than 1.2 million volunteers who give more than 270 million hours of unpaid labour to the sector.
- Non-profits have over 105,000 paid employees – but only 10% of all non-profit organisations employ paid staff (the other 90% rely entirely on volunteers).

== Publications and resources ==
The Office for the Community and Voluntary Sector operates two "toolkit sites" to assist New Zealand public servants in their work with community and voluntary sector organisations:

- Good Practice Participate
- Good Practice Funding

The OCVS also offers a number of publications of interest, which provide more detail on the community and voluntary sector in New Zealand:

- an electronic newsletter is produced eight times a year
- Quarterly Generosity Indicators measuring the giving of time, money and goods
- Keeping it Legal E Ai Ki Te Ture – Legal Responsibilities of Voluntary Organisations (Dec 2005)
- Briefing to the Incoming Minister:
- Mahi Aroha - Māori perspectives on volunteering and cultural obligations
- Managing Well – Resources for Community and Voluntary Organisations (Aug 2005)
- Government Policy on Volunteering (Dec 2002)
- He Waka Kotuia – Joining Together on a Shared Journey: Report of the Community-Government Relationship Steering Group (Aug 2002)
- Communities and Government – Potential for Partnership: Summary Report of the Community and Voluntary Sector Working Party (Apr 2001)

The above publications can be viewed on the website or requested from the OCVS (e-mail: ocvs@dia.govt.nz).
