= Diana Crossan =

New Zealand public servant

Dame Diana Crossan DNZM
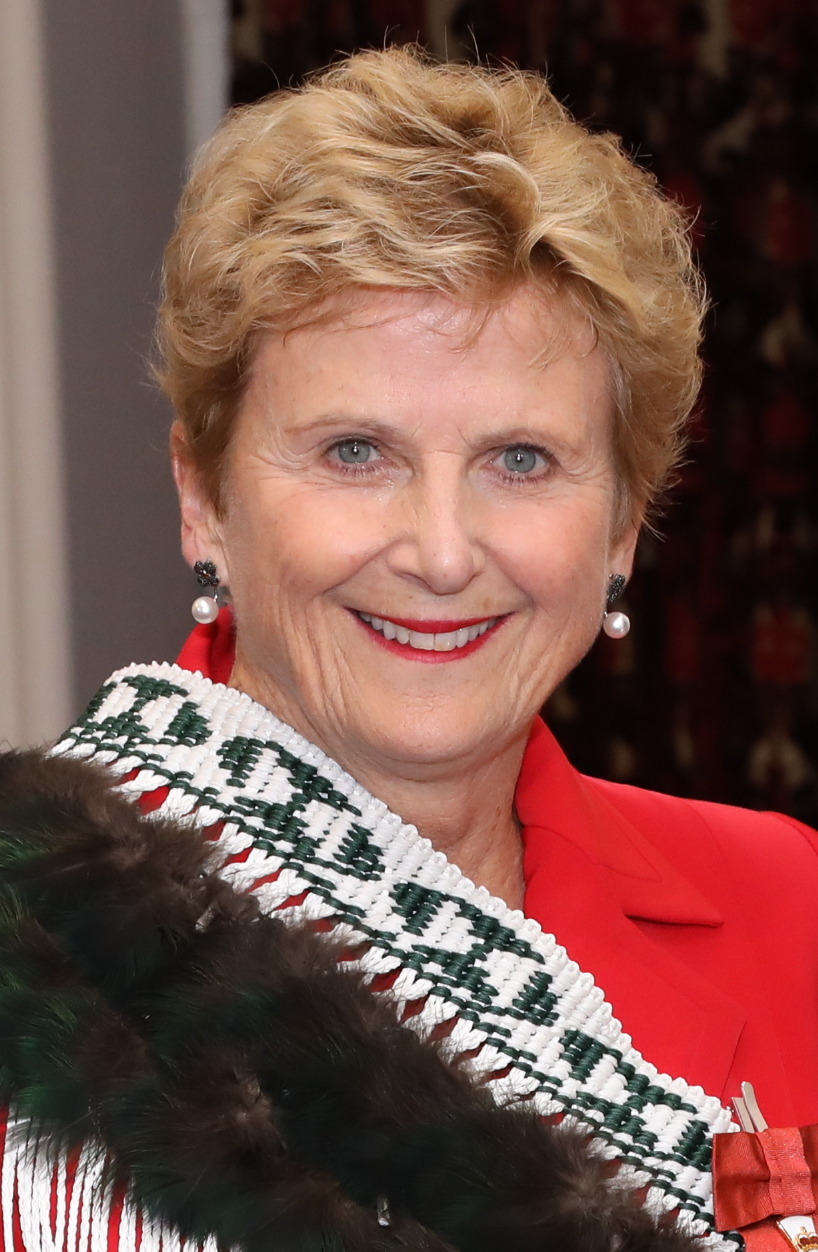
- Crossan in 2019

Personal details
- Born: Diana Buchanan Crossan; 1949 (age 76–77) Akaroa, New Zealand
- Occupation: Public servant

Dame Diana Buchanan Crossan DNZM (born 1949) is a New Zealand public servant. She worked at the State Services Commission, where she was the first manager of the Equal Employment Opportunities Unit.

She served as Retirement Commissioner between 2003 and 2013, and contributed to the development of the KiwiSaver scheme. From 2013 to 2017, she was chief executive of Wellington Free Ambulance. In the 2019 New Year Honours, Crossan was appointed a Dame Companion of the New Zealand Order of Merit, for services to the State.
