= Walter Tanner =

2nd Chief Censor of New Zealand
- In office 1927–1938
- Preceded by: William Jolliffe
- Succeeded by: W. A. von Keisenberg

Personal details
- Born: Walter Alfred Tanner; 1878; Northampton, England
- Died: 17 July 1958 (aged 79–80); Wellington, New Zealand

Walter Alfred Tanner (1878 – 14 July 1958) was New Zealand's second Chief Censor of Films from 1927 to 1938. He was born in Northampton, England, the son of William Tanner, Member of Parliament for the Heathcote and Avon electorates in Christchurch, and Emily E. Browett. He married Laura Matilda Maude Torckler in 1907. They had one son and one daughter. He died in Wellington aged 79.

Tanner worked for the Customs Department censoring publications for seditious content before becoming Chief Censor William Jolliffe's assistant censor of cinematograph films in 1924. On Jolliffe's death in 1927, Tanner became New Zealand's second Chief Censor, a position he held until 1938.

Tanner’s tenure straddled the introduction of sound to motion pictures. He wrote that “the more vivid presentations of life made possible by the addition of sound and colour has made it necessary to issue an increased number of certificates recommending films as more suitable for adult audiences.” The introduction of sound also appeared to increase the number of bans. In 1930, 102 films, 3.9% of those submitted, were banned.

== Silent era ==
Tanner's decisions were not without controversy in either era. One example in the silent era concerned the New Zealand feature film The Te Kooti Trail (1927), a re-enactment of the war fought in the Bay of Plenty between Māori Chief Te Kooti and British forces in 1869. New Zealand director Rudall Hayward intended to premier it on 11 November 1927. Conscious of the need to forestall adverse Māori reaction to the film, the government decided to consult Māori and asked Ringatu Māori from Whakatāne to attend a private screening on the day intended for the premiere. The next day, Tanner refused to approve the film until changes were made to two intertitles, one that referred to Te Kooti "resorting to faked miracles", the other referring to Te Kooti’s lieutenant Peka McLean as "torture master" and "stage manager of miracles". The subsequent "storm of publicity" surrounding the film ensured it played to full houses when it premiered a few days later at the Strand Theatre in Auckland on 17 November 1927. Tanner wrote a conciliatory letter to Hayward in 1928 calling the whole affair "a case of pure misunderstanding".

Western Samoa was governed by New Zealand under a League of Nations Trusteeship from 1914 until independence in 1962. As such, New Zealand censorship law also extended to films intended for exhibition in Samoa. Because New Zealand legislation provided that no film could be approved which "in the opinion of the censor, depicts any matter that is against public order and decency, or the exhibition of which for any other reason is, in the opinion of the censor, undesirable in the public interest", Tanner had broad discretion to consider matters that, in his view, were uniquely relevant to Samoa. He wrote in 1929 however, that film censoring in Samoa "should certainly be done at Apia" by those sensitive to local colonial conditions: "One of the principal concerns in Samoa is to see that the white man is not brought into contempt by the exhibition of films which would tend to lessen the respect of the natives for the white man, which is so essential. From the motives of safety this is necessary in a territory where the natives heavily outnumber the whites. Even a picture with the famous dog Rin Tin Tin would be questionable as the dog frequently fights and overcomes the villain — a white man".

== Sound era ==
Tanner's most controversial decision from the sound era remains his banning of All Quiet on the Western Front on 18 June 1930 for "being out of keeping with the unwarlike atmosphere" of the period. A recut version of the film was eventually passed by the Board of Review in 1931. Tanner also refused to approve The Blue Angel and Hedy Lamarr’s fifth film Ecstasy. He required cuts to King Kong.

Films from other dominions of the British Empire appeared to fare slightly better than American and foreign films. In 1932 Tanner listed 74 British quota films examined in the first nine months of that year. Two had been rejected (a ban rate of 2.7%), one for "vulgar incidents", the other for bad language. Seven required cuts for bad language ("my God" and "by God"), three for vulgar incidents, and two for violence.

Tanner was succeeded as Chief Censor by his assistant, W. A. von Keisenberg, in 1938.

== Notes ==
1. S R Edwards, "Docudrama from the twenties" 41 Historical Review 58 (November 1993)
2. Letter dated 17 January 1928 from W A Tanner to R Hayward on file at the Office of Film and Literature Classification
3. Memorandum dated 31 October 1929 from W A Tanner to the Under-Secretary for Internal Affairs on file at the Office of Film and Literature Classification
