= W. A. von Keisenberg =

3rd Chief Censor of New Zealand
- In office 1938–1949
- Preceded by: Walter Tanner
- Succeeded by: Gordon Mirams

Personal details
- Born: William Arthur Leopold von Keisenberg; 18 April 1881 Wanganui, New Zealand
- Died: 29 July 1967 (aged 86) Auckland, New Zealand

William Arthur Leopold von Keisenberg (18 April 1881 – 29 July 1967) was New Zealand's third Chief Censor, a position he held from 1938 to 1949.

== Career ==
Von Keisenberg worked for P. R. Dix's vaudeville enterprises as Dix's personal secretary and advance representative for Dix's North Island touring company between 1901 and 1904. His career in the public service started when he joined the Railways Department as a shorthand writer and typist in 1904. He was transferred to the Electoral Department in 1908 and to the Department of Internal Affairs in 1912. In May 1920 he became the officer-in-charge of the Government Advertising Department, and in February 1928, became assistant censor of films under Chief Censor Walter Tanner. Von Keisenberg became Chief Censor in 1938. He was succeeded by Gordon Mirams in 1949.

== Approach to censorship ==
Von Keisenberg wrote that the censor's job was "to tone down those [films] which are capable of improvement and to reject those entirely which over-step reasonable bounds, leaving the final responsibility with the Appeal Board – if the Renter [i.e. exhibitor] considers an appeal worth while."

Secure in the knowledge that his opinion had to give way to the Chief Censor's when he was Tanner's assistant, and to the Appeal Board when he became Chief Censor, von Keisenberg was happy to air his own dissenting, and generally somewhat conservative, views in public. When The Devil’s Cabaret , a short colour B-grade talkie about the devil opening a night club to recruit more people to Hell, played at the Paramount in Wellington in 1932, von Keisenberg wrote to a correspondent, "I certainly would not have passed it myself. I told the Censor so too."

== Wartime censorship ==
By secret memorandum dated 20 July 1939, the Prime Minister's Department instructed von Keisenberg to act as agent for the Director of Publicity "for the purpose of exercising the necessary additional control over films in time of war." Such additional prohibitions included information on troop movements, "matter calculated to impair the efficiency, morale or discipline of His Majesty's Fighting Forces, or to create or encourage disaffection among the civil population", and "matters as might help to raise the morale of the enemy."

Many films about the Second World War, even those made by Allies, came under close scrutiny. For example, the Oscar-winning Arise, My Love starring Claudette Colbert and Ray Milland, required a cut to remove a comment by a maid about the war that "our men have to die, and their sons and their sons" so as not to demoralise civilians. Even films not directly about the war were cut. When it came to New Zealand in 1942, Gone with the Wind required excisions in six places to reduce the intensity of the American Civil War battle scenes.

== Personal life ==
Von Keisenberg was born in Wanganui, New Zealand on 18 April 1881, the son of William Carl H. von Keisenberg. He married Margaret Mary A. Martini of Kumara in 1912. They had four daughters. He died in Auckland in 1967 aged 86. His wife Margaret also died in 1967, and they are both buried in the Glenfield Cemetery.

== Notes ==
1. Letter dated 3 November 1932 from W. A. von Keisenberg to Mr Fraser on file at the Office of Film and Literature Classification.
2. Internet Movie Database https://www.imdb.com/title/tt0022817/.
3. Above n1.
4. On file at the Office of Film and Literature Classification.
