= Kathryn Paterson =

Australian psychologist

9th Chief Censor of New Zealand
- In office 18 April 1994 – December 1998
- Preceded by: Jane Wrightson
- Succeeded by: Bill Hastings

Personal details
- Born: Kathryn Mary Paterson; 17 October 1962
- Died: 20 September 1999 (aged 36)
- Education: Macquarie University

Kathryn Mary Paterson (17 October 1962 – 20 September 1999) was the ninth Chief Censor of New Zealand and a Director of Australia's Office of Film and Literature Classification.

== Biography ==
Paterson was raised in the sea-side town of Umina, north of Sydney, Australia, the daughter of June, a teacher, and Phil Paterson, a pharmacist.

Paterson obtained an honours degree in psychology from Macquarie University in 1991. Between 1984 and 1993, she was a senior researcher at the Australian Broadcasting Tribunal (a predecessor of the Australian Communications and Media Authority), a member of the Australian Film Censorship Board and manager of the information unit of the Office of Film and Literature Classification (Australia).

Paterson became Chief Censor of New Zealand in 1994. She was New Zealand's ninth Chief Censor, and the first appointed under the new Films, Videos, and Publications Classification Act 1993. This Act gave the Office of Film and Literature Classification jurisdiction to classify a broader range of publications than was possessed by her predecessor as Chief Censor, Jane Wrightson, whose jurisdiction was limited to the classification of films for public exhibition. When she was appointed Chief Censor, the opposition women's affairs spokesperson Elizabeth Tennet MP raised fears that Paterson would import Australian "macho cultural imperialism" into New Zealand.

In December 1998, Paterson returned to Sydney to become director of the Australian Office of Film and Literature Classification, a position she held until her death from cancer ten months later on 20 September 1999. In New Zealand, Paterson was succeeded as Chief Censor by her deputy, Bill Hastings.
