= David Shanks =

New Zealand chief censor

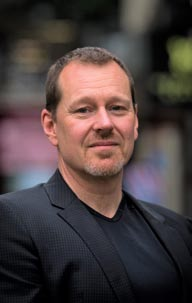

12th Chief Censor of New Zealand
- In office 8 May 2017 – 6 May 2022
- Preceded by: Andrew Jack
- Succeeded by: Caroline Flora
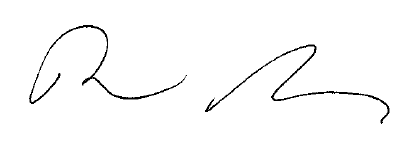
- Signature

David Shanks is a New Zealand solicitor who served as the twelfth Chief Censor of New Zealand from 2017 to 2022, replacing the previous Chief Censor, Andrew Jack.

On 8 May 2020, Shanks was reappointed for a two-year term concluding on 6 May 2022. He was succeeded by Caroline Flora, the current Chief Censor of New Zealand, on 20 July 2022.
