= Indecent Publications Tribunal =

- Established: 1 January 1964
- Dissolved: 26 August 1993; 31 years ago
- Jurisdiction: Government of New Zealand
- Composition method: Executive selection
- Appeals to: High Court of New Zealand
- Judge term length: 5 years
- Number of positions: 5
- Type of tribunal: Commission of Inquiry

The Indecent Publications Tribunal was a government censorship organisation that operated in New Zealand from 1964 until 1993. It was established under the Indecent Publications Act 1963 and consisted of five members, with one a High Court barrister or solicitor, and four other members with two having qualifications in the field of literature or education. John Robson, a senior public servant, was instrumental in having provisions for the Tribunal to be established under the Act.

Decisions made by the Tribunal are still in force unless subsequently overturned after being re-classified. The Office of Film and Literature Classification now serves a similar function.

== Notable cases ==
In July 1992, the New Zealand Police Commissioner unsuccessfully attempted to prevent a concert by the American band Body Count in Auckland, arguing that "Anyone who comes to this country preaching in obscene terms the killing of police, should not be welcome here," before taking Body Count and Warner Bros. Records to the Indecent Publications Tribunal, in an effort to get the song "Cop Killer" banned under New Zealand's Indecent Publications Act 1963. This was the first time in twenty years that a sound recording had come before the censorship body, and the first ever case involving popular music. After reviewing the various submissions, and listening carefully to the album, the Tribunal found the song "Cop Killer" to be "not exhortatory," saw the album as displaying "an honest purpose," and found Body Count not indecent.

== See also ==
- Censorship in New Zealand
- Censorship by country
