= Film and Literature Board of Review =

New Zealand censorship system appeals body

Agency overview
- Formed: 1993
- Jurisdiction: New Zealand
- Minister responsible: Brooke van Velden, Minister of Internal Affairs (New Zealand)
- Parent department: Department of Internal Affairs (New Zealand)

The Film and Literature Board of Review is the appeals body for New Zealand's print and media censorship system, established by section 91 of the Films, Videos, and Publications Classification Act 1993. It reviews decisions made by the Office of Film and Literature Classification. It is administered by the Department of Internal Affairs.
