= Douglas McIntosh =

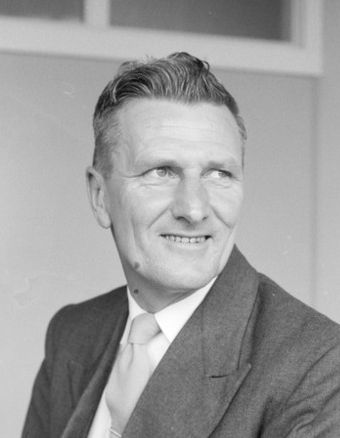
- McIntosh in 1959

5th Chief Censor of New Zealand
- In office 1960–1976
- Preceded by: Gordon Mirams
- Succeeded by: Bernard Tunnicliffe

Personal details
- Born: Douglas Charles McIntosh; 23 May 1916 Karori, Wellington, New Zealand
- Died: 25 December 1976 (aged 60)

Douglas Charles McIntosh (23 March 1916 – 25 December 1976) was New Zealand's fifth Chief Censor of Films from 1960 until his death on Christmas Day, 1976. In this role, he applied the Cinematograph Films Act 1928 to films; initially this was the 1961 version of the Act, then just before his death it was replaced by the 1976 Act.

== Personal life ==
McIntosh was born on 23 March 1916 in Karori, a suburb of Wellington. He married Mable Agnes Mildred Western (Picton) and they had one son and two daughters. He died 25 December 1976 in Karori.

A follower of Cricket and Rugby Union, he coached a local Karori rugby team, regularly buying boots for players who could not afford them.

== Censorship ==
The Nevile Lodge cartoon depicted very clearly the balancing act conducted by the role of Chief Censor at the time. Bill Rowling had been caught cutting embarrassing bits from a think tank report. The cartoon below highlights the influence of Patricia Bartlett using moral suasion and public opinion to influence the censorship decisions. The Censor's office at the time, had four censors aged from their thirties to sixties, specifically to provide a balanced judgment at a time of growing liberal public attitudes.

Political cartoon of Prime Minister censors report

The 1967 film Ulysses was passed by McIntosh and was viewed by the R18 audience's uncut. Though cinemas had to segregate the public based on gender, because of the sexual content and language both Wellington based newspapers The Dominion and The Post viewed this as preferable to censorship.

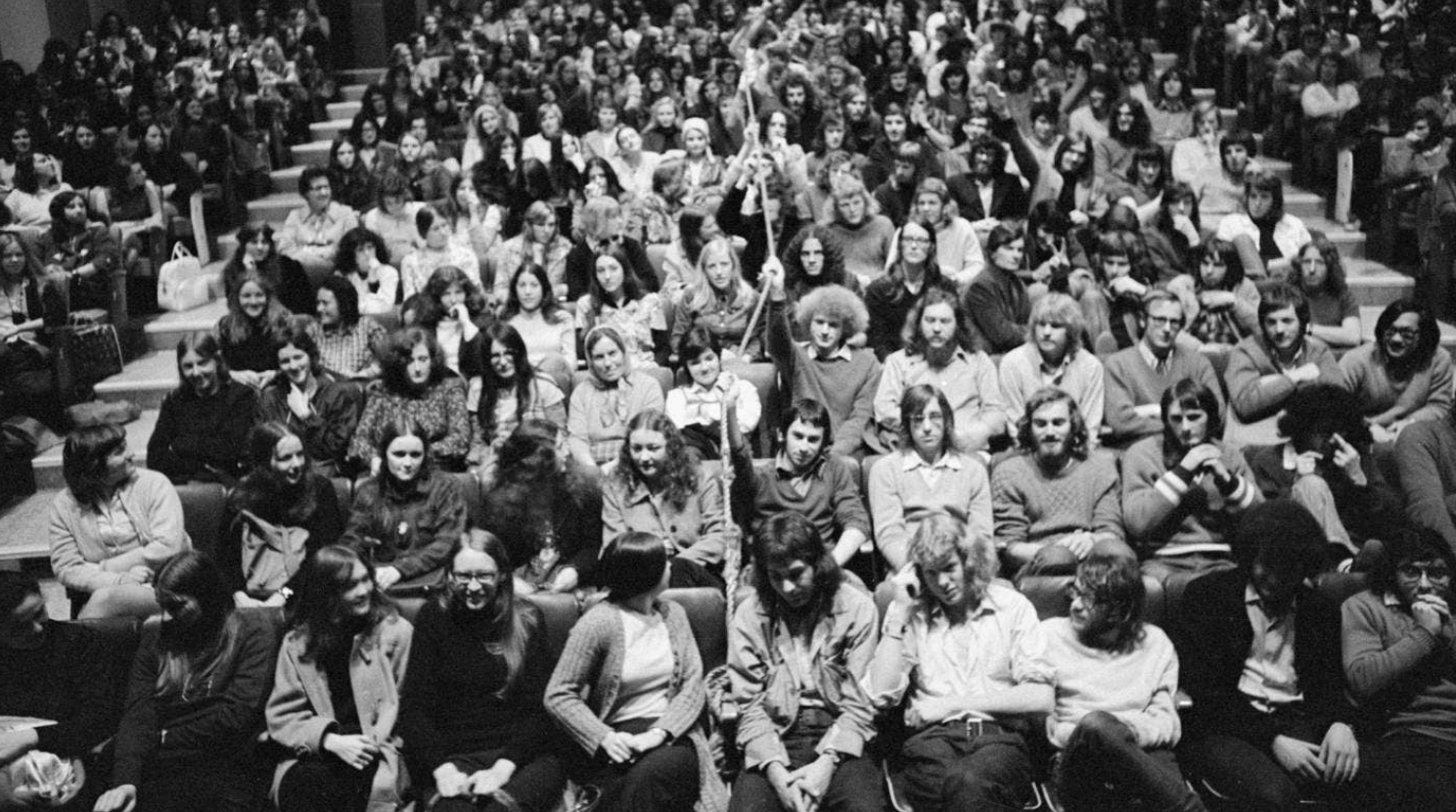
Audience segregated for Ulysses released uncut for R18 attendance
