= Te Ara Ahunga Ora Retirement Commission =

New Zealand Crown entity

Coordinates: 41°16′51.612″S 174°46′32.094″E

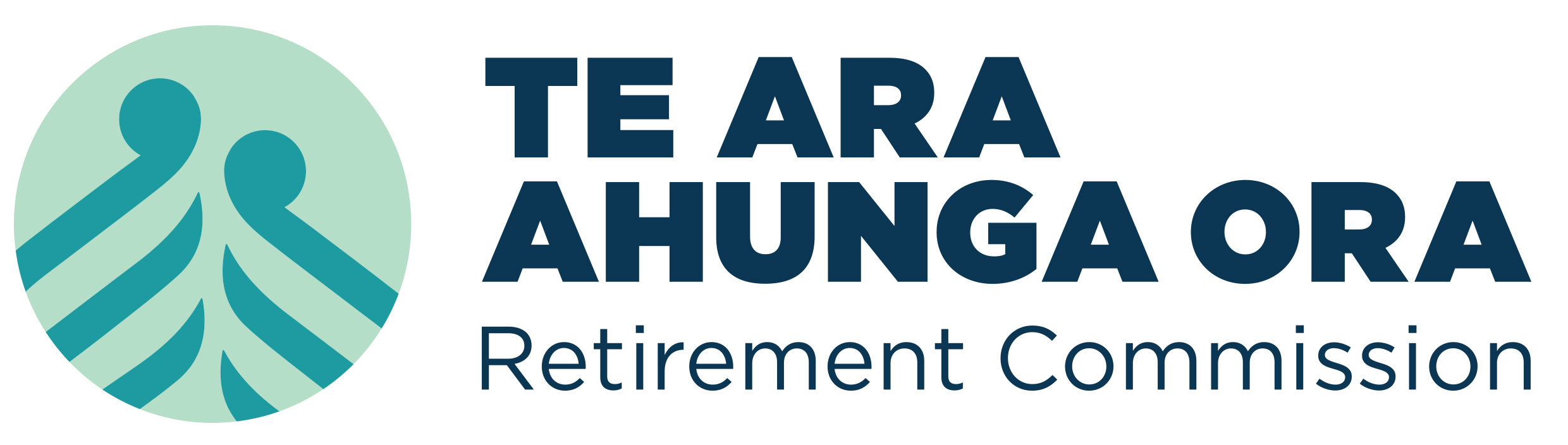
- Empowering the people of Aotearoa on their journeys to a better retirement.

Agency overview
- Formed: 1995
- Jurisdiction: New Zealand Government
- Headquarters: Level 15, 19 Victoria St West Auckland, New Zealand
- Employees: 30+
- Annual budget: $8.6 million
- Minister responsible: Hon. Andrew Bayly, Commerce & Consumer Affairs
- Agency executive: Jane Wrightson, Retirement Commissioner
- Website: https://retirement.govt.nz/

Te Ara Ahunga Ora Retirement Commission (formerly Commission for Financial Capability), is a Crown entity under the New Zealand Crown Entities Act 2004. The Commission provides financial education and information to residents of New Zealand, advises government on retirement income policy, and monitors the effectiveness of the Retirement Villages Act 2003.

== Overview ==
Te Ara Ahunga Ora Retirement Commission operates under the NZ Superannuation and Retirement Income Act, which provides the statutory framework for its operations. It also has certain functions under the Retirement Villages Act 2003. The commission is funded by New Zealand's central government and has an annual budget of around $NZ8.6m.

The commission's activities include:

- Review of Retirement Income Policy - completed every three years to assess effectiveness, identify future issues, provide policy stability and inform policy development
- Sorted - providing free independent and financial impartial information and tools
- Money Week - New Zealand's annual, nationwide financial capability week is held in August.
- Research on New Zealanders' financial capability and retirement income
- Monitoring the retirement village regulatory framework

== Retirement Commissioner ==
Te Ara Ahunga Ora Retirement Commission is the office of the Retirement Commissioner, Jane Wrightson. She was appointed by the Minister of Commerce for a three-year term from February 2020. Wrightson was formerly Chief Executive of NZ on Air.

Previous Retirement Commissioners are:

- Diane Maxwell (2013-2019)
- Diana Crossan (2002-2013)
- Colin Blair (1995-2001)

== See also ==
- New Zealand Superannuation Fund
