= Jane Wrightson =

New Zealand's Chief censor

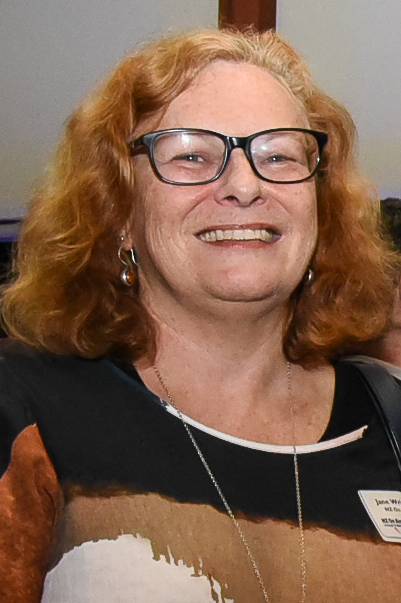
- Wrightson in 2019

8th Chief Censor of New Zealand
- In office 1991–1994
- Preceded by: Arthur Everard
- Succeeded by: Kathryn Paterson

Personal details
- Born: Jane Theresa Wrightson; 2 January 1958 (age 68) Hastings, New Zealand
- Education: Hastings Girls' High School
- Alma mater: Victoria University of Wellington; Massey University

Jane Theresa Wrightson (born 2 January 1958) is a New Zealand public sector executive. Since 2020 she has served as Retirement Commissioner. She was previously New Zealand's Chief Censor from 1991 to 1993, the chief executive of the Broadcasting Standards Authority from 2003 to 2007 and the chief executive of NZ On Air from 2007 to 2020.

== Early life and family ==
Wrightson was born in Hastings on 2 January 1958, the daughter of Pearl Wrightson (née French) and Trevor Wrightson. She was educated at Hastings Girls' High School from 1971 to 1975, before going on to university. She completed a Bachelor of Arts in English at Victoria University of Wellington in 1979, a Diploma in Business Administration at Massey University in 1985, and a Master of Business Administration with Distinction at Massey in 1994.

== Career ==
=== Early career ===
Wrightson worked for a decade for TVNZ, including in the programming department, and was head of commissioned programmes from 1989 to 1991.

=== Chief Censor ===
Between 1991 and 1994, Wrightson served as Chief Film Censor. She was New Zealand's first female Chief Film Sensor. Wrightson wrote in 1992 that her “strong will has been a blessing and a curse to me. The strength is needed as a film censor – there are so many individuals and groups pulling in so many different directions that after absorbing all the approaches one simply has to go with instincts, consultation and a healthy dollop of common sense.”

In 1992, Wrightson banned Henry: Portrait of a Serial Killer, calling it a “stalk and slash” movie too violent for New Zealand screens. This was the first mainstream film to be banned from exhibition at the Wellington Film Festival, whose director called her too conservative. The film was later passed, with cuts, on video by the Video Recordings Authority. Earlier that year, she passed, as R18, the Australian tantric sex film Sacred Sex which was appealed unsuccessfully to the Film and Video Board of Review by the Society for the Promotion of Community Standards who viewed her classification as too liberal.

=== Later career ===
Having unsuccessfully applied to continue as Chief Censor after Parliament passed the Films, Videos, and Publications Act 1993, Wrightson became television programme manager, and soon deputy chief executive, of New Zealand On Air in 1994. She then became chief executive of the Screen Production and Development Association (SPADA) in 1999, and chief executive of the Broadcasting Standards Authority in 2003. Between 2007 and 2020 Wrightson was chief executive of funding body New Zealand On Air.

In February 2020, Wrightson took up the role of Retirement Commissioner for a three-year term, and was appointed to a second term in 2022. In September 2025, she announced that she would not seek a further term in the role when her appointment expires in 2026.

In 2023, Wrightson was appointed to a three-year term on the board of Radio New Zealand. Wrightson is also a chartered member of the New Zealand Institute of Directors, and a trustee of the Digital Media Trust that set up NZ screen history and culture site NZ On Screen.

== Other activities ==
Wrightson retired from the Board of Netball New Zealand in 2007 after an eight-year stint, and served on the Swimming NZ Board for five years until 2012. She was also a film reviewer for the Evening Post newspaper in Wellington from 1994.
