= William Jolliffe (censor) =

New Zealand public servant

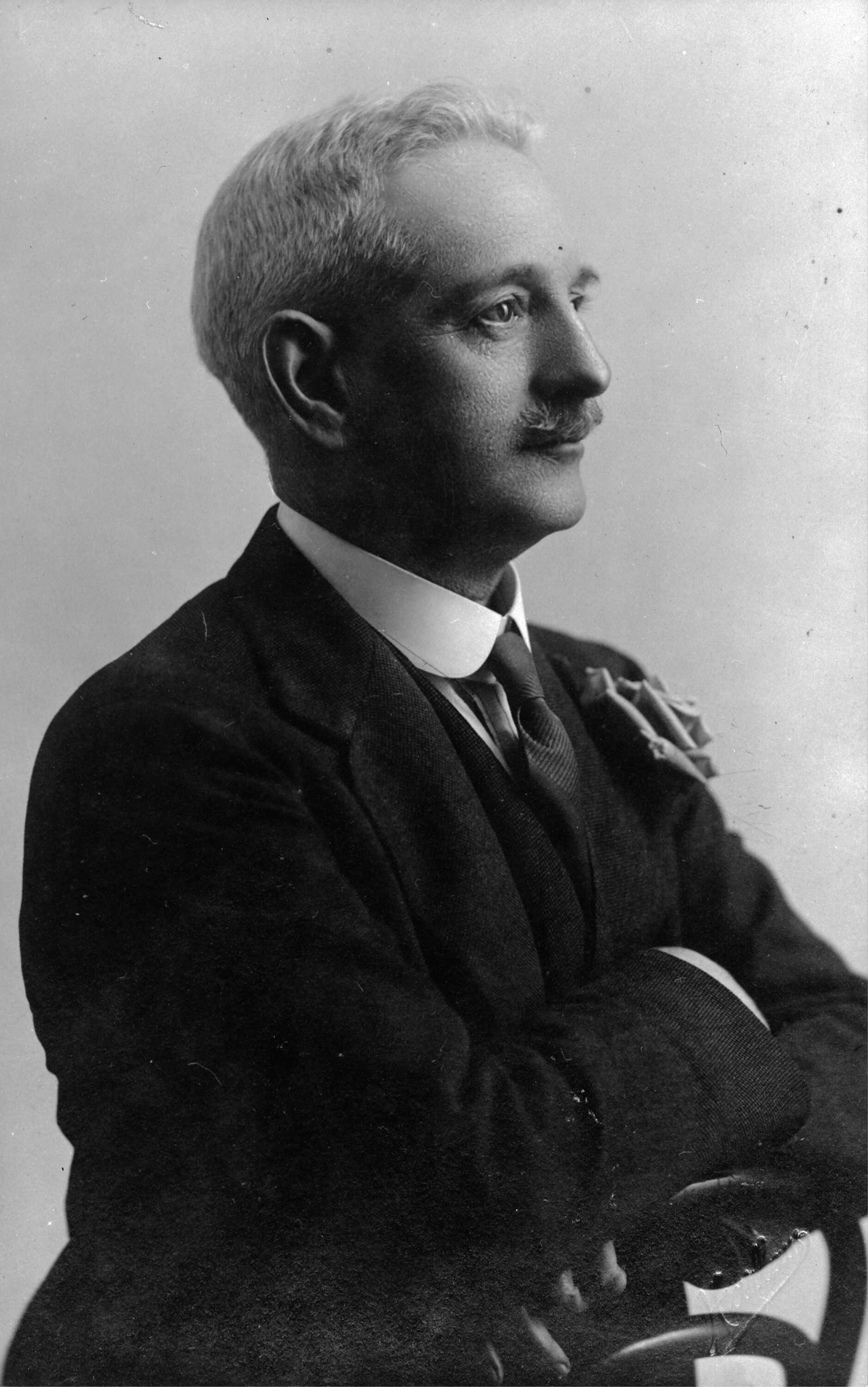
- Jolliffe c. 1901

1st Chief Censor of New Zealand
- Succeeded by: Walter Tanner

Personal details
- Born: September 16, 1851 Bloomsbury, Middlesex, England
- Died: 26 April 1927 (aged 75)

William Jolliffe (16 September 1851 – 26 April 1927) was New Zealand's first Chief Censor of Films.

Jolliffe was born in Bloomsbury, Middlesex, England, in 1851, the son of William Peter Jolliffe and Harriett Penny. He qualified as a barrister and practised in London, Newcastle upon Tyne and North Shields. On his father's death in 1887, he moved to Australia, and then to New Zealand in 1896. He married 20-year-old Nellie Young in Lower Hutt on 6 November 1902. They had two daughters and a son.

After drafting the Cinematograph-film Censorship Act 1916, Jolliffe was appointed Censor of Cinematograph Films on 16 September 1916, at the age of 65. The act provided that no film could by exhibited to the public until it had been passed by the censor. The act also provided that no film could be approved which "in the opinion of the censor, depicts any matter that is against public order and decency, or the exhibition of which for any other reason is, in the opinion of the censor, undesirable in the public interest". Distributors were given the right to appeal the censor's rejection of a film, but no one could appeal the approval of a film until 1934.

In Jolliffe's first full year (1917 to 1918) he reviewed 2,825 films totalling over 1,400 hours, and refused to approve 43, he also required cuts to 279. There was only one appeal against his decisions, and it was dismissed. The revenue generated by the examination fees for this number of films meant that Jolliffe could afford to hire an assistant, James McDonald, in August 1918.

In 1917, after church groups objected to D. W. Griffith's film Intolerance being passed without cuts, the Minister of Internal Affairs suggested that Jolliffe adopt and publish a list of prohibited topics. Jolliffe resisted this suggestion because he believed that it was impossible to formulate guidelines applicable to all films, a view that has become a tradition among New Zealand censors to this day. Nevertheless, he generally required cuts from films that depicted "the commission of crime in a manner likely to be imitated, especially by the young, or to give information as to methods to persons of a criminal tendency", indecency in dress, irreverent treatment of religious subjects, disloyalty to King and country, and "any matter likely to effect class hatred".

In 1920, Jolliffe introduced two ratings: a "U" (for "universal") certificate denoted that a film was suitable for everyone; and an "A" rating indicated that a film was more suitable for adult viewing. Both certificates were recommendations intended to help parents decide what their children could view. In May 1921 the Minister (probably illegally) directed Jolliffe to ensure that any film in which "thieving, robbery, murder, or suicide is made the feature" was not approved for exhibition. No discernible increase in banned films resulted, and the requirement was quietly dropped by 1925.

William Jolliffe died in office and was succeeded by his assistant, W. A. Tanner.
