= Indecent Publications Act 1910 =

Act of Parliament in New Zealand

Indecent Publications Act

New Zealand Parliament
- Long title: An Act to prohibit the Publication or Sale of Indecent Literature.
- Commenced: 1910

Related legislation
- Indecent Publications Act 1963
- Status: Repealed

The Indecent Publications Act was an Act of Parliament passed in New Zealand in 1910 replacing earlier censorship legislation. The purpose was to "censor smut while protecting worthwhile material".

It was repealed by the Indecent Publications Act 1963.

== See also ==
- Censorship in New Zealand
