= Minister for the Community and Voluntary Sector =

New Zealand minister of the Crown

- Coat of arms of New Zealand

- Flag of New Zealand

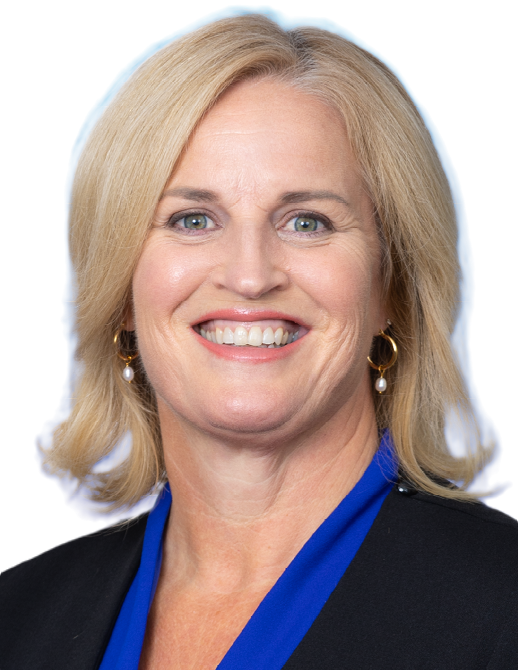
- Incumbent; Louise Upston since 27 November 2023
- New Zealand Office for the Community & Voluntary Sector
- Style: The Honourable
- Member of: Cabinet of New Zealand; Executive Council
- Reports to: Prime Minister of New Zealand
- Appointer: Governor-General of New Zealand
- Term length: At His Majesty's pleasure
- Formation: 10 December 1999
- First holder: Steve Maharey
- Salary: $288,900
- Website: www.beehive.govt.nz

The Minister for the Community and Voluntary Sector is a minister in the government of New Zealand. The minister oversees the government's relationship to the community and voluntary sector and the services they provide. The minister is also responsible for the New Zealand Office for the Community & Voluntary Sector.

== List of ministers ==
Key

Labour National Māori Party

No.	Name	Portrait	Term of office		Prime Minister
1	Steve Maharey		10 December 1999	15 August 2002	Clark
2	Tariana Turia		15 August 2003	30 April 2004	Clark
3	Rick Barker		24 August 2004	19 October 2005	Clark
4	Winnie Laban		19 October 2005	5 November 2007	Clark
5	Ruth Dyson		5 November 2007	19 November 2008	Clark
(2)	Tariana Turia		19 November 2008	12 December 2011	Key
6	Jo Goodhew		12 December 2011	20 December 2016	Key
7	Alfred Ngaro		20 December 2016	26 October 2017	English
8	Peeni Henare		26 October 2017	3 July 2019	Ardern
9	Poto Williams		3 July 2019	6 November 2020	Ardern
10	Priyanca Radhakrishnan		6 November 2020	27 November 2023	Ardern
10	Priyanca Radhakrishnan		6 November 2020	27 November 2023	Hipkins
11	Louise Upston		27 November 2023	present	Luxon
