= Samuel Haywood Mirams =

New Zealand engineer and architect

Samuel Haywood Mirams (28 August 1837–10 October 1911) was a New Zealand engineer and architect. He was born on the Isle of Sheppey, Kent, England on 28 August 1837.
