= Patricia Bartlett =

New Zealand social morality campaigner (1928–2000)

Patricia Maureen Bartlett OBE (17 March 1928 – 8 November 2000) was a New Zealand conservative Catholic activist of the 1970s and 1980s.

== Biography ==
She was born in Napier to Bertrand and Ivy Bartlett (née Boult). She attended Sacred Heart school in Napier and failed her University Entrance examination. In 1947, she became a primary school teacher. She entered a Sisters of Mercy (R.S.M.) convent at Hill Street in Wellington after her mother died in 1950. She left the cloister in 1969 to become increasingly involved in social conservative political activism. In 1970, she founded the Society for Promotion of Community Standards (SPCS), which survived her death, albeit in much reduced circumstances.

Bartlett remained the secretary of her organisation for 25 years, during which time SPCS campaigned against exposure of bared female breasts (1970) and won initial bipartisan support from social conservative New Zealand Labour Party and New Zealand National Party MPs and local government leaders in Wellington and Auckland. From its beginning, SPCS sought assistance from conservative Catholics and fundamentalist Protestants alike. SPCS membership would often come from kindred conservative Christian pressure groups, such as SPUC (the Society for the Protection of the Unborn Child - now Voice for Life, and the Christian Heritage Party (a fundamentalist Christian-based socially conservative political party outside Parliament, which is now defunct) SPCS also networked with counterpart international Christian Right pro-censorship organisations elsewhere in the world such as Dr John H Court and the Adelaide-based Australian Festival of Light, Mary Whitehouse and her National Viewers and Listeners Association in the United Kingdom and Dr Judith Reisman and her "Institute for Media Education" within the United States.

Over the years, she campaigned for theatre censorship, against the stage show Hair in Wellington, (1972) and prohibition of adolescent-oriented sex education books like Down Under the Plum Trees (1972). SPCS tried to have Stanley Kubrick's A Clockwork Orange and Last Tango in Paris (1972) prohibited, which led to New Zealand Film Society activism against SPCS attempts to stifle freedom of artistic expression throughout the late seventies and early eighties.

In the 1977 Queen's Silver Jubilee and Birthday Honours, Bartlett was appointed an Officer of the Order of the British Empire, for services to the community.

In the mid-eighties, Bartlett and SPCS fell afoul of social change, as the High Court issued its Howley v Lawrence Publishing decision in 1986, shortly after the Fourth New Zealand Labour Government (1984–1990) passed the Homosexual Law Reform Act 1986 and decriminalised homosexuality. The High Court ruled that magazine presentations of gay men did not depict criminal acts per se, and over the course of the late 80s, conservative Christians found themselves hampered by new rigorous empirical justifications for censorship policy. Adjusting to the new circumstances, social liberal opponents of rigorous state censorship successfully used social scientific data to offset conservative claims within state censorship policy. Central government regulatory rationalisation led to consolidation of previously disparate film, video and publications censorship agencies spread across several New Zealand government departments into one body, the Office of Film and Literature Classification, in 1993

In 1993, Bartlett was awarded the New Zealand Suffrage Centennial Medal.

As time went on, Bartlett's elderly former patrons and pro-censorship activists died. In 1995, Bartlett learned she had inherited her own mother's cardiovascular problems, which meant her enforced retirement from public life. In 1996, she retired as SPCS Secretary, and lived quietly in Upper Hutt until her death in November 2000. She never married.

== Legacy ==
Bartlett's pro-censorship campaigns contributed to a backlash against social conservatism in New Zealand during the eighties and nineties. However, after its founder's death, the Society for Promotion of Community Standards survives as a pressure group that attempted to obstruct film festival schedules, opposed the prostitution law reform and the ending of parental corporal punishment of children due to the passage of Sue Bradford's Child Discipline Bill and the introduction of same-sex marriage in New Zealand

== See also ==
- Censorship in New Zealand
