= Andrew Jack (censor) =

Chief Censor of New Zealand

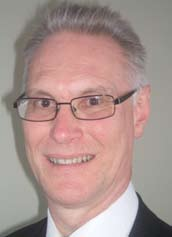

11th Chief Censor of New Zealand
- In office 7 March 2011 – 6 March 2017
- Preceded by: Bill Hastings
- Succeeded by: David Shanks

Personal details
- Born: Andrew Robert Jack; 1960 or 1961 (age 65–66) Howick, Auckland
- Education: Pakuranga College; University of Auckland
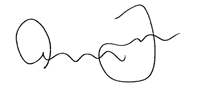
- Signature

Academic background
- Doctoral advisor: Bill Hastings

Dr Andrew Robert Jack (age 65–66) is a New Zealand barrister who served as the eleventh Chief Censor of New Zealand from March 2011 to March 2017.

Jack grew up in Howick, Auckland. His mother was a radiographer; his father was a school teacher who had emigrated from Northern Ireland. He has earned at least five degrees, including a PhD in law (supervised by Bill Hastings), a master's degree in public policy, and degrees in ancient history and classical Greek. He also holds qualifications in teaching English as a second language, quantity surveying, and diamond grading.

Prior to becoming Chief Censor, Jack had been group manager of the legal and advisory services at New Zealand Customs Service and chief legal advisor for the New Zealand Police.

His work during his time as chief censor included the Classification Office banning objectionable slogans and artwork on Wicked campervans. He said in an interview, "These are four-foot high mobile billboards advocating the consumption of illicit drugs using characters that are understood, attractive and recognised by children and that's just not OK."

As of 2016, Jack lived in Vogeltown, Wellington with his wife Jan and their three dogs.
