= Volunteering New Zealand =

National peak body for volunteering in New Zealand

- Founded: 2001
- Type: Non-profit national organization
- Location: Wellington, NZ
- Region served: New Zealand
- Method: Volunteerism
- Website: www.volunteeringnz.org.nz

Volunteering New Zealand (VNZ) is the national peak body for volunteering in New Zealand incorporated in 2001. It is an association of volunteer centres and national and other organisations with a commitment to volunteering. Current member organisations cover emergency services, health, welfare, education, culture, faith-based services, community support, ethnic groups, sport and recreation, conservation, special interests, advocacy and international volunteering.

In 2008, the contribution of volunteers in New Zealand was estimated to be at over $3.3 billion. A study published in 2016 found that New Zealand has one of the largest non-profit sectors in the world on a proportional basis, but that the majority of organisations find recruitment a challenge and that for many, the average age of their volunteers is increasing.

== Governance ==
Volunteering New Zealand has an Executive Board of up to nine people. From the 2008 AGM, six are elected members with three appointed members – Maori, Pacific and Other Ethnicities.

== Regional Volunteer Centres ==
New Zealand has various regional Volunteer Centres, listed below.

- Volunteering Northland
- Gisborne Volunteer Centre
- New Plymouth Volunteer Service
- Taupo Volunteer Centre
- Volunteer Nelson
- Volunteer Wellington
- Volunteer Porirua
- Volunteer Hutt
- Volunteer Kapiti
- Volunteer Western Bay of Plenty
- Volunteer Whanganui
- Volunteering Auckland
- Volunteering Canterbury
- Volunteering Hawkes Bay
- Volunteering Mid & South Canterbury
- Volunteering Otago
- Volunteering Waikato
- Volunteer Marlborough
- Volunteer Resource Centre Manawatu & Districts

== International link ==
Volunteering New Zealand is the New Zealand Representative of the International Association for Volunteer Effort (IAVE). This is an international non-governmental organisation representing volunteerism worldwide. It has individual and organizational members in 80 countries. Volunteering NZ has also established good working relationships with Volunteering Australia which has made accessible a variety of educational resources and participation in their programmes. Another partner is the Australasian Association of Volunteer Administrators (AAVA).
