= Indecent Publications Act 1963 =

Act of Parliament in New Zealand

Indecent Publications Act

New Zealand Parliament
- Commenced: 1 Jan 1964

Related legislation
- Indecent Publications Act 1910; Films, Videos, and Publications Classification Act 1993
- Status: Repealed

The Indecent Publications Act was a New Zealand Act of Parliament enacted in 1963.

It repealed the Indecent Publications Act 1910, Indecent Publications Amendment Act 1954, Indecent Publications Amendment Act 1958, Indecent Publications Amendment Act 1961, and sections of the Crimes Act 1961 relating to the 1910 Act. The Indecent Publications Tribunal was established by the Act.

There were four amendments to the Act before being repealed by the Films, Videos, and Publications Classification Act 1993.

== See also ==
- Censorship in New Zealand
