= Gordon Mirams =

New Zealand public servant (1909–1966)

- Mirams in 1956

4th Chief Censor of New Zealand
- In office 1949–1959
- Preceded by: W. A. von Keisenberg
- Succeeded by: Douglas McIntosh

Personal details
- Born: Gordon Holden Mirams; 9 March 1909 Christchurch, New Zealand
- Died: 29 November 1966 (aged 57) Wellington, New Zealand

Gordon Holden Mirams (9 March 1909 – 29 November 1966) was the fourth Chief Censor of New Zealand.

== Personal life ==
He was the son of Leslie Haywood Mirams and Mary Elvire Webb. He married Ruth Taylor in Christchurch on 23 November 1932. They had three daughters and one son.

== Biography ==
Before becoming a film censor, Mirams worked as a journalist and film reviewer for the Christchurch Sun, the New Zealand Radio Record, the Dominion newspaper, and the New Zealand Listener. In his book Speaking Candidly: films and people in New Zealand published in 1945, Mirams argued that film has an enormous influence on culture. For this reason, he campaigned for more local New Zealand documentary and feature film production. He also argued for the need to show quality films that were generally ignored by commercial film distributors, which led to the formation of the New Zealand Film Institute, a national federation of film societies, which Mirams chaired.

In Speaking Candidly, Mirams was forthcoming about his views on censorship. He wrote, “I am one of those people who believe that, ideally, the best censorship, like the best government, is none at all” and “in the long run, the community is best left to censor itself; that when given the opportunity coupled with knowledge it can usually be relied on to reject the bad and accept the good.” On the other hand, Mirams was critical of Chief Censor W. A. von Keisenberg’s decision to approve the film Iceland in which Sonja Henie abandons her Icelandic sweetheart in favour of a US Marine, “at the very time that the American-serviceman-New-Zealand-girl problem was causing concern” in New Zealand. He wrote, “I am against censorship on principle, [but] if we must have it I would suggest that the custodians of our screen morals might be better employed in discouraging this sort of thing than in worrying about whether we should, say, be allowed to hear a few naughty words in Noël Coward’s In Which We Serve.”

In 1947 Mirams was appointed first assistant film information officer, Mass Communications Section, UNESCO. In this position, he worked to develop film as an educational medium. He left Paris in 1949 to become New Zealand’s fourth Censor of Cinematograph Films, a position he held until 1959.

Mirams was the first censor to make liberal use of the R certificate, allowing films to be restricted to specific audiences and age groups. He also made extensive use of non-restrictive certificates that recommended films as more suitable for exhibition to particular audiences. These included the GA certificate that approved a film for general exhibition but recommended it as more suitable for adults, and the GY certificate that approved a film for general exhibition but recommended it as more suitable for persons 13 years of age and over.

Mirams was sensitive to the influence film had on social and cultural perceptions. After the release of the Mazengarb Report on Moral Delinquency in Children and Adolescents in 1954, Mirams responded to community fears about juvenile delinquency by banning The Wild One starring Marlon Brando and Rebel Without A Cause starring James Dean. Although the ban on "The Wild One" was upheld by a review board, it overthrew his decision on "Rebel Without a Cause" and overturned his bans on several other movies. Recent research shows that during the 1950s Mirams provoked fears about the effects of modern American popular culture, especially comics and movies, in attempts to ban or severely restrict community access to such media. In this he was supported by leading members of the New Zealand left such as Elsie Locke.

In 1959, Mirams accepted a permanent appointment at UNESCO’s mass media division in Paris where he worked on the development of children’s television programmes. He was succeeded as Chief Censor by Douglas McIntosh.

Mirams resigned from UNESCO in 1966, and died in Wellington on 29 November 1966.
