= Caroline Flora =

New Zealand chief censor

Caroline Flora is New Zealand's Chief Censor in the Office of Film and Literature Classification (Māori: Te Mana Whakaatu), also known as the Classification Office. She was appointed to the position in 2022.

Flora grew up in Lower Hutt. She attended the University of Otago where she studied psychology and graduated with a Masters in Law. In 2007 she was admitted to the bar. She held positions in the New Zealand Police and Ministry of Health where she was Associate Deputy Director General. She took up the position of Chief Censor in July 2022 for a three year term.
