= Bob McCoskrie =

New Zealand Conservative Christian

Bob McCoskrie is the national director of the New Zealand conservative Christian non-profit non-governmental organisation (NGO) Family First New Zealand.

== Education ==
McCoskrie has a Masters of Commerce with Honours from the University of Auckland and a Diploma of Teaching from the Auckland College of Education.

== Professional career ==
McCoskrie initially worked as a tertiary lecturer in accounting, commercial law and tax law at Manukau Polytechnic for four years (1986–1990) and then as the Director of Youth for Christ South Auckland in Ōtara (1990–1994) before he founded and co-ordinated the Papatoetoe Adolescent Christian Trust (1994–2002) working with at-risk youth and their families. In 1996 he was appointed a Justice of the Peace (JP). In 2002 he joined the Christian New Zealand radio station Radio Rhema as a talkback radio host and current affairs presenter on Sky TV's Shine TV.

== Family First New Zealand ==
In 2006, as a 42-year old church leader, McCoskrie founded Family First New Zealand to lobby for Christian family values and encouraging traditional Christian beliefs in communities throughout New Zealand, and has been the organisation's national director and main spokesperson since then. In 2009 Victoria University religious studies professor Paul Morris said Family First was "successfully broadening the Christian agenda in New Zealand politics in a way never seen before". In 2020 Family First was described as "New Zealand's most formidable conservative campaigners".

In May 2024, McCoskrie was scheduled to speak at the "Unsilenced: Middle New Zealand on ideology" event at Tākina convention centre in Wellington on 18 May alongside Destiny Church leader Brian Tamaki and former National Party MP Simon O'Connor. Protest groups Queer Endurance In Defiance and the Pōneke Anti-Fascist Coalition denounced the conference for allegedly promoting transphobia and planned a protest rally outside. Te Papa Museum, which manages bookings at Tākina, and Wellington City Council, which owns the venue, reviewed safety arrangements. Māori ward city councillor Nīkau Wi Neera called for the event's cancellation, while Free Speech Union chief executive Jonathan Ayling defended the conference on free speech grounds. Following the safety review, Te Papa allowed the event to proceed. Speakers at the conference included Tamaki, O'Connor and British activist Kellie-Jay Keen-Minshull (who participated via video-link). Conference attendees numbered 360, while the protest organised by Pōneke Anti-Fascist Coalition and Queer Endurance in Defiance attracted 500 people.

== Personal life ==
McCoskrie and his wife Tina, who he married in a Methodist church in about 1989, have three children and live in South Auckland.

== Views ==
McCoskrie has spoken against the legalisation of same-sex marriage. He has said that New Zealand's decision to legalise same-sex marriage is "an arrogant act of cultural vandalism" and "makes a mockery of marriage". After New Zealand legalised same-sex marriage in 2013 McCoskrie resigned as a marriage celebrant in opposition to gay marriage. His anti-same-sex marriage views are consistent with Family First New Zealand.

When voters rejected the legalisation of recreational cannabis in 2020, McCoskrie said that he was "pretty stoked" with the cannabis referendum results and that New Zealanders "understood the perceived benefits of legalisation were not greater than the harms that were going to come on society."

McCoskrie publicly stated that Roe v. Wade – which gave the legal right to an abortion in the United States – being repealed in 2022 was a "great day".

In April 2024, McCoskrie appeared in a podcast with right-wing alternative Internet radio Reality Check Radio host Maree Buscke discussing the British Cass Review on gender identity services.
