= Department of Internal Affairs =

Public service department of New Zealand

- Te Tari Taiwhenua (Māori)

Agency overview
- Formed: 1840
- Preceding agency: Colonial Secretary's Office
- Jurisdiction: New Zealand
- Headquarters: 45 Pipitea Street; Thorndon; Wellington 6011
- Employees: 2,381 FTE staff (30 June 2020)
- Annual budget: Vote Internal Affairs; Total budget for 2019/20 ▼$721,026,000
- Minister responsible: Hon Brooke Van Velden, Minister of Internal Affairs
- Agency executive: Paul James, Chief Executive and Secretary for Internal Affairs Secretary for Local Government Government Chief Digital Officer
- Child agencies: Archives New Zealand; New Zealand Lottery Grants Board; Local Government Commission; National Library of New Zealand; Office for the Community & Voluntary Sector; Charities Services; National Emergency Management Agency
- Website: www.dia.govt.nz

The Department of Internal Affairs (DIA; Māori: Te Tari Taiwhenua) is the public service department of New Zealand charged with issuing passports; administering applications for citizenship and lottery grants; enforcing censorship and gambling laws; registering births, deaths, marriages and civil unions; supplying support services to ministers; and advising the government on a range of relevant policies and issues.

Other services provided by the department include a translation service, publication of the New Zealand Gazette (the official government newspaper), a flag hire service, management of VIP visits to New Zealand, running the Lake Taupō harbourmaster's office (under a special agreement with the local iwi) and the administration of offshore islands.

== History ==
=== 19th century ===
The Department of Internal Affairs traces its roots back to the Colonial Secretary's Office, which from the time New Zealand became a British colony, in November 1840, was responsible for almost all central government duties. The department was the first government department to be established in the Colony of New Zealand (the New Zealand Customs Service is the oldest extant government department in New Zealand, having been established in January 1840), and it became the home for a diverse range of government functions providing services to New Zealanders and advice to Ministers of the Crown. A former Minister of Internal Affairs, Michael Bassett, wrote a history of the department, The Mother of All Departments, the title of which reflects this status. The department's role has changed over time as new departments and ministries have been formed.

The Colonial Secretary was the chief aide of the governor of New Zealand. Until 1848 his office dealt with all correspondence between the governor and his employees, and between officials and the public. Other early functions included inspecting sheep, running prisons, supervising government printing, licensing auctioneers, registering births, deaths and marriages, collecting statistics, and responsibility for gambling, fire brigades, constitutional matters (including running elections) and citizenship. Some of these functions are still duties of the modern department, which gained its present name in 1907, but other functions eventually grew into standalone government agencies. As the department's functions have changed over time, there has become a growing acknowledgement that it carries responsibility for all government functions which are not substantial enough to justify a standalone organisation or do not fit well into any other existing departments.

From 1853 the Colonial Secretary's Office coordinated the relationship between central government and provincial government and, when the provinces were abolished in 1876, took on responsibility for the new system of local government.

=== 20th century ===
Over the twentieth century the department's functions would include cultural affairs, civil defence, a translation service, conservation, tourism, sport and recreation, support for ethnic communities, and support services for government ministers. Several new government departments have been formed by establishing new agencies around former Internal Affairs services. The electoral office moved to the Department of Justice in 1950 before becoming an independent Electoral Commission in 2010. The Department of Industries and Commerce took over the statistics function in 1931; an independent Department of Statistics was created in 1957. The Department of Conservation was established in 1987 by merging the department's wildlife service with other similar entities.

The National Library of New Zealand and Archives New Zealand were separated from the department in the late 1990s but merged back in 2011. A standalone Ministry of Cultural Affairs (now the Ministry for Culture and Heritage, which in the present day also has responsibility for the sport and recreation portfolio) was established in 1991. The department briefly held responsibility for tourism from 1998 until 2000, when this was combined with other former Ministry of Commerce functions in the new Ministry of Economic Development, now the Ministry of Business, Innovation and Employment.

=== 21st century ===
The Ministry of Civil Defence and Emergency Management, which had been a business unit within the department since before World War II, was transferred to the Department of the Prime Minister and Cabinet in 2009. The Office of Ethnic Communities, originally a single part-time position within the department, became the new Ministry for Ethnic Communities in 2021.

The department has also gained responsibilities that previously belonged to other agencies. In 2009 the department took responsibility for government technology services from the State Services Commission. The Office for the Community and Voluntary Sector was transferred to the department from the Ministry of Social Development in 2011. In 2021, the department gained the legal ability to process requests from people wishing to change their sex on their birth certificate, including to a non-binary marker, rather than them needing to go through the court system. In 2024, the government announced that the department would become the sole supervisor of the anti-money laundering and countering financing of terrorism regulatory system, taking over functions currently overseen by the Reserve Bank and Financial Markets Authority.

In mid-April 2024, the department experienced a backlog in processing New Zealand passport applications due to the installation of computer system upgrades in March 2024 and increased seasonal demand. Standard passport processing took eight weeks while urgent passport processing took three days. The number of passports processed dropped from 38,000 in February 2024 to half that number in March 2024. On 14 May 2024, the department apologised for delays in wait times for processing passport applications.

On the 25th of September 2025, the National Emergency Management Agency (the successor to the previous Ministry of Civil Defence and Emergency Management) was returned to the department from the Department of the Prime Minister and Cabinet.

== Structure ==
The head of the department holds concurrent roles as Chief Executive, Secretary for Internal Affairs, Secretary for Local Government and Government Chief Digital Officer.

=== Business groups ===
As at 12 February 2025:

- Policy and Te Tiriti
- Partnerships and Commissions
- Enterprise Services
- Digital Services
- Regulatory and Identity Services
- Office of the Chief Executive

=== Related organisations ===
The department provides secretariat support for several entities including:

- The Gambling Commission
- The Local Government Commission
- Commissions of Inquiry and ad hoc bodies such as the Royal Commission of Inquiry into Historical Abuse in State Care and in the Care of Faith-based Institutions
- The Library and Information Advisory Commission, Ngā Kaiwhakamārama i ngā Kohikohinga Kōrero
- The Public Lending Right Advisory Group
- The Guardians Kaitiaki of the Alexander Turnbull Library
- The Archives Council
- The Film and Literature Board of Review
- The Confidential Listening and Assistance Service
- National Emergency Management Agency

== Ministers ==
The department serves 6 portfolios and 6 ministers. In addition, the department also has responsibilities to the Minister of Finance in relation to community trusts and to the Minister of Foreign Affairs in relation to the Peace and Disarmament Education Trust and the Pacific Development Conservation Trust.

Officeholder	Portfolios	Other responsibilities
Hon Brooke Van Velden	Lead Minister (Department of Internal Affairs); Minister of Internal Affairs	
Rt Hon Christopher Luxon		Minister Responsible for Ministerial Services
Hon Simon Watts	Minister of Local Government	
Hon Paul Goldsmith	Minister for Digitising Government	
Hon Louise Upston	Minister for the Community and Voluntary Sector	
Rt Hon Winston Peters	Minister for Racing	

== Initiatives Targeting Gambling ==
The Department of Internal Affairs (DIA) is known as the industry regulator in the New Zealand gambling sector. It works alongside the Ministry of Health as the organisation responsible for minimising gambling harm. The DIA regulates four main types of legalised gambling in New Zealand: 1. New Zealand Lotteries products (Lotto) 2. TAB racing and sports betting (TAB) 3. Class 4 electronic gaming machines, commonly referred to as 'pokies' 4. Casino gambling – these differ from Class 4 as they are run for-profit by private entities rather than not-for-profit corporate societies

=== Legislation Used ===
In regulating these bodies, the DIA is responsible for administering the Gambling Act 2003, which includes licensing, monitoring compliance, policy formation and implementation, harm minimisation, and general oversight. Under this Act, the DIA has the authority to hold individual venue operators liable for up to $50,000 in fines or one year of imprisonment, and body corporates up to $100,000 for unauthorised gambling.

The Act is expansive, with some infringement provisions covering specific operational requirements. For example, failing to display required problem gambling signage at a venue with Class 4 machines can incur a fee of $1,000.

=== Harm Minimisation ===
In justifying the use of this regulation, the DIA identifies a range of potential harms associated with gambling, including (but not limited to): • Financial problems • Problems at work (ranging from poor performance to fraud) • Poor parenting and other relationship issues • Family violence • Alcohol abuse • Mental health problems • Suicide Alongside the Gambling Act 2003, the DIA uses policy tools such as advertisements and policy templates to ensure those being supervised act in accordance with the law. These tools help raise awareness of the potential harms of gambling and ensure that those operating venues capable of causing such harm act in a responsible and proactive manner.

== See also ==
- Censorship in New Zealand
- Gambling in New Zealand
- Five Nations Passport Group

== Bibliography ==
- Bassett, Michael The Mother of All Departments (1997, Auckland University Press, Auckland) ISBN 1-86940-175-1
