= Films, Videos, and Publications Classification Act 1993 =

Act of Parliament in New Zealand

Films, Videos, and Publications Classification Act

New Zealand Parliament
- Long title: An Act to consolidate and amend the law relating to the censoring of films, videos, books, and other publications; and to repeal the Indecent Publications Act 1963, the Films Act 1983, and the Video Recordings Act 1987
- Assented to: 26 August 1993; 33 years ago
- Commenced: 1 October 1994
- Administered by: Department of Internal Affairs

Repeals
- Indecent Publications Act 1963; Films Act 1983; Video Recordings Act 1987
- Status: Current legislation

The Films, Videos, and Publications Classification Act 1993 is an Act of Parliament in New Zealand.

It repealed the Indecent Publications Act 1963, the Films Act 1983 and the Video Recordings Act 1987.

In 2015, the book Into the River was briefly placed under an interim restriction order under the Act, banning it completely from being sold or supplied.

== See also ==
- Censorship in New Zealand
