= Outline of Kiribati =

Island country in the central Pacific Ocean

Coordinates: 1°52′25.2″N 157°25′32.8″W

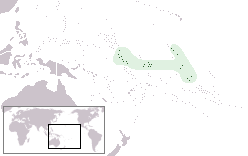
Location of Kiribati

The Flag of Kiribati

The Coat of arms of Kiribati

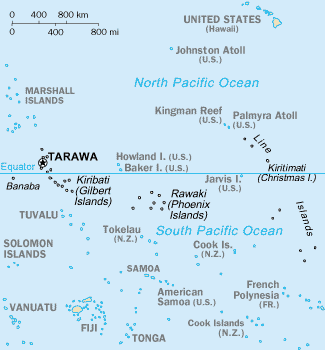
An enlargeable map of the Republic of Kiribati

The following outline is provided as an overview of and topical guide to Kiribati:

Kiribati – sovereign island nation located in the central equatorial Pacific Ocean.

== General reference ==
- Pronunciation: /ˈkɪrɪbæs/ KIRR-ib-ass
- Common English country name: Kiribati
- Official English country name: The Republic of Kiribati
- Common endonym(s):
- Official endonym(s):
- Adjectival(s): I-Kiribati
- Demonym(s): I-Kiribati
- Etymology: Name of Kiribati
- ISO country codes: KI, KIR, 296
- ISO region codes: See ISO 3166-2:KI
- Internet country code top-level domain: .ki

== Geography of Kiribati ==
Geography of Kiribati

- Kiribati is: an island country
- Location:
  - Southern Hemisphere and Eastern Hemisphere
  - Pacific Ocean
    - South Pacific
      - Oceania
        - Micronesia
  - Time zones:
    - Line Islands – UTC+14
    - Phoenix Islands – UTC+13
    - Gilbert Islands – UTC+12
  - Extreme points of Kiribati
    - High: unnamed location on Banaba 81 m (266 ft)
    - Low: Pacific Ocean 0 m
  - Land boundaries: none
  - Coastline: Pacific Ocean 1,143 km
- Population of Kiribati: 110,000 (2015) - 188th most populous country
- Area of Kiribati: 726 km^{2}
- Atlas of Kiribati

=== Environment of Kiribati ===
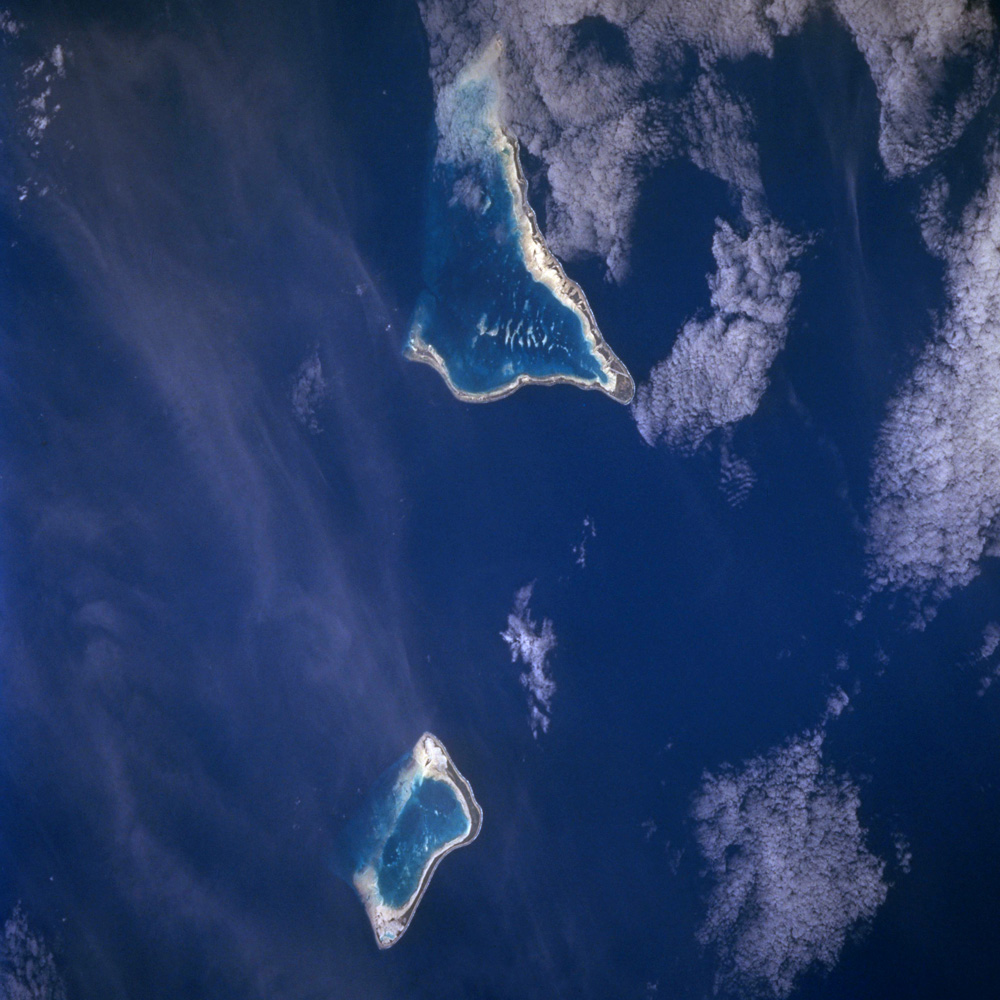
An enlargeable satellite image of the islands of Tarawa and Maiana

- Climate of Kiribati
- Protected areas of Kiribati
- Wildlife of Kiribati
    - Birds of Kiribati
    - Mammals of Kiribati

==== Natural geographic features of Kiribati ====
- Islands of Kiribati
- Lakes of Kiribati
- Rivers of Kiribati
- World Heritage Sites in Kiribati: Phoenix Islands Protected Area

==== Ecoregions of Kiribati ====
List of ecoregions in Kiribati

==== Administrative divisions of Kiribati ====
None

===== Municipalities of Kiribati =====
- Capital of Kiribati: South Tarawa
- Cities of Kiribati

=== Demography of Kiribati ===
Demographics of Kiribati

== Government and politics of Kiribati ==
Politics of Kiribati

- Form of government: unitary parliamentary representative democratic republic
- Capital of Kiribati: South Tarawa
- Elections in Kiribati
- Political parties in Kiribati

=== Branches of the government of Kiribati ===
Government of Kiribati

==== Executive branch of the government of Kiribati ====
- Head of state and head of government: Taneti Maamau, Beretitenti
- Cabinet of Kiribati

==== Legislative branch of the government of Kiribati ====
- Parliament of Kiribati: House of Assembly (unicameral)

==== Judicial branch of the government of Kiribati ====
- High Court of Kiribati
- Court of Appeal of Kiribati (higher court)

=== Foreign relations of Kiribati ===
Foreign relations of Kiribati

- Diplomatic missions in Kiribati
- Diplomatic missions of Kiribati

==== International organization membership ====
The Republic of Kiribati is a member of:

- African, Caribbean, and Pacific Group of States (ACP)
- Asian Development Bank (ADB)
- Commonwealth of Nations
- Food and Agriculture Organization (FAO)
- International Bank for Reconstruction and Development (IBRD)
- International Civil Aviation Organization (ICAO)
- International Development Association (IDA)
- International Federation of Red Cross and Red Crescent Societies (IFRCS)
- International Finance Corporation (IFC)
- International Fund for Agricultural Development (IFAD)
- International Labour Organization (ILO)
- International Maritime Organization (IMO)
- International Monetary Fund (IMF)
- International Olympic Committee (IOC)
- International Red Cross and Red Crescent Movement (ICRM)
- International Telecommunication Union (ITU)
- International Trade Union Confederation (ITUC)
- Organisation for the Prohibition of Chemical Weapons (OPCW)
- The Pacific Community (SPC)
- Pacific Islands Forum (PIF)
- South Pacific Regional Trade and Economic Cooperation Agreement (Sparteca)
- United Nations (UN)
- United Nations Conference on Trade and Development (UNCTAD)
- United Nations Educational, Scientific, and Cultural Organization (UNESCO)
- Universal Postal Union (UPU)
- World Health Organization (WHO)
- World Meteorological Fergus

=== Law and order in Kiribati ===
- Constitution of Kiribati
- Human rights in Kiribati
  - LGBT rights in Kiribati
  - Freedom of religion in Kiribati
- Law enforcement in Kiribati

=== Military of Kiribati ===
Military of Kiribati There is no military in Kiribati.

== History of Kiribati ==
History of Kiribati

== Culture of Kiribati ==
Culture of Kiribati

- Dance in Kiribati
- Languages of Kiribati
- Media in Kiribati
- National symbols of Kiribati
  - Coat of arms of Kiribati
  - Flag of Kiribati
- People of Kiribati
- Public holidays in Kiribati
- Religion in Kiribati
  - Christianity in Kiribati
  - Hinduism in Kiribati
  - Islam in Kiribati
- World Heritage Sites in Kiribati:
  - Phoenix Islands Protected Area

=== Art in Kiribati ===
- Dance in Kiribati
- Music of Kiribati
- Television in Kiribati

=== Sports in Kiribati ===
- Football in Kiribati
- Kiribati at the Olympics

== Economy and infrastructure of Kiribati ==
Economy of Kiribati

- Economic rank, by nominal GDP (2007): 189th (one hundred and eighty ninth)
- Communications in Kiribati
  - Internet in Kiribati
- Currency of Kiribati: Dollar
  - ISO 4217: AUD
- Transport in Kiribati

== Education in Kiribati ==
Education in Kiribati

== Infrastructure of Kiribati ==
- Transportation in Kiribati
  - Airports in Kiribati

== See also ==
- Gilbertese language
- Index of Kiribati-related articles
- List of international rankings
- List of Kiribati-related topics
- Member state of the Commonwealth of Nations
- Member state of the United Nations
- Outline of geography
- Outline of Oceania
