= 2020s in politics =

This article lists significant political and societal historical events of the 2020s, presented as a historical overview in narrative format.

== COVID-19 pandemic ==
Confirmed deaths per 100,000 population as of 20 December 2023

The COVID-19 pandemic triggered global social and economic disruption, including the largest global recession since the Great Depression. It led to the postponement or cancellation of events, widespread supply shortages exacerbated by panic buying, famines affecting hundreds of millions of people, and decreased emissions of pollutants and greenhouse gases. Educational institutions were partially or fully closed. Misinformation circulated through social media and mass media. There were incidents of xenophobia and discrimination against Chinese people and against those perceived as being Chinese or as being from areas with high infection rates.

Countries with at least one election date altered

The pandemic impacted international relations and affected the political systems of multiple countries, causing suspensions of legislative activities, isolation or deaths of multiple politicians and reschedulings of elections due to fears of spreading the virus. The pandemic also triggered broader debates about political issues such as the relative advantages of democracy and autocracy, how states respond to crises, politicization of beliefs about the virus, and the adequacy of existing frameworks of international cooperation.

== International conflicts ==
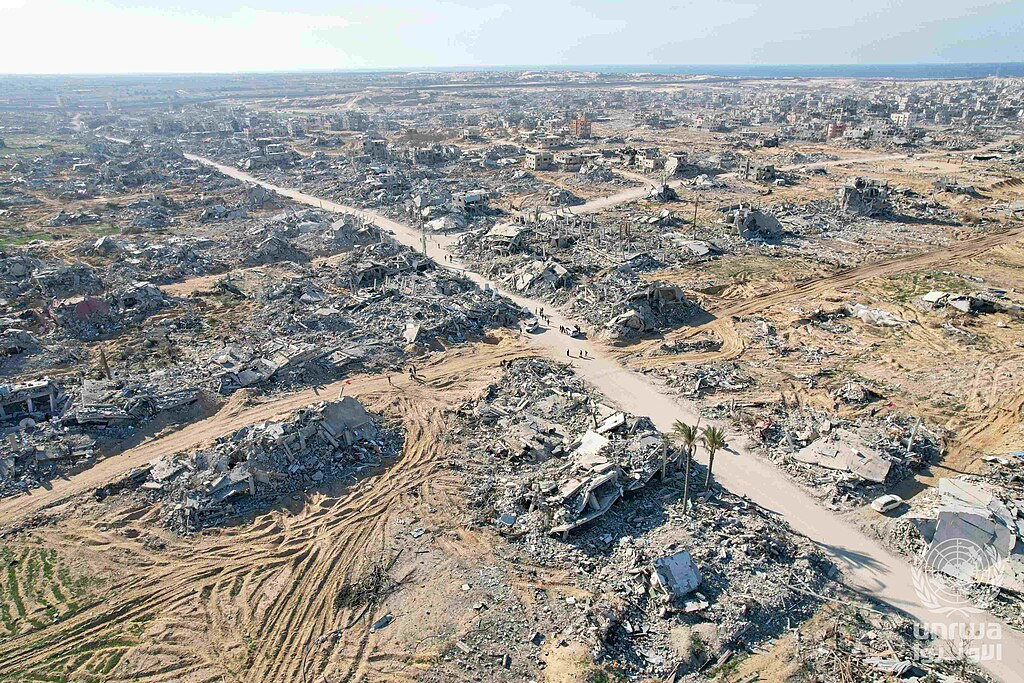
Aerial view showing the destruction of Rafah in the Gaza Strip in January 2025

=== Nuclear disarmament ===
The Treaty on the Prohibition of Nuclear Weapons, which totally bans nuclear weapons, went into effect on January 22, 2021. The treaty is not supported by NATO or any known nuclear powers.

=== Second Cold War ===
On May 24, 2020, China Foreign Minister Wang Yi said that relations with the U.S. were on the "brink of a new Cold War" after it was fueled by tensions over the COVID-19 pandemic. In his September 2021 speech to the United Nations General Assembly, US President Joe Biden said that the US is "not seeking a new Cold War or a world divided into rigid blocs." Biden further said that the US would cooperate "with any nation that steps up and pursues peaceful resolution to shared challenges," despite "intense disagreement in other areas, because we'll all suffer the consequences of our failure."

=== Indian border skirmishes ===
Beginning on 5 May 2020, Chinese and Indian troops engaged in aggressive melee, face-offs, and skirmishes at locations along the Sino-Indian border, including near the disputed Pangong Lake in Ladakh and the Tibet Autonomous Region, and near the border between Sikkim and the Tibet Autonomous Region. Additional clashes also took place at locations in eastern Ladakh along the Line of Actual Control (LAC).

In late May, Chinese forces objected to Indian road construction in the Galwan river valley. According to Indian sources, melee fighting on 15–16 June 2020 resulted in the deaths of Chinese and Indian soldiers. Media reports stated that soldiers were taken captive on both sides and released in the coming few days while official sources on both sides went on to deny this. On 7 September, for the first time in 45 years, shots were fired along the LAC, with both sides blaming each other for the firing. Indian media also reported that Indian troops fired warning shots at the PLA on 30 August.

Partial disengagement from Galwan, Hot Springs, and Gogra occurred in June–July 2020 while complete disengagement from Pangong Lake north and south bank took place in February 2021. Following disengagement at Gogra in August 2021, Indian analysts pointed out that the LAC has shifted westwards at patrol point 17A (PP 17A).

Amid the standoff, India reinforced the region with approximately 12,000 additional workers, who would assist India's Border Roads Organisation in completing the development of Indian infrastructure along the Sino-Indian border. Experts have postulated that the standoffs are Chinese pre-emptive measures in responding to the Darbuk–Shyok–DBO Road infrastructure project in Ladakh. China has also extensively developed its infrastructure in these disputed border regions and is continuing to do so. The revocation of the special status of Jammu and Kashmir, in August 2019, by the Indian government has also troubled China. However, India and China have both maintained that there are enough bilateral mechanisms to resolve the situation. This includes multiple rounds of colonel, brigadier, and major general rank dialogue, special representatives' meetings, (Note: In 2003, during Prime Minister Vajpayee's visit to China, the Special Representatives mechanism for boundary dispute resolution was set up. Since then, the Special Representatives have had 22 rounds of talks till December 2019.) meetings of the 'Working Mechanism for Consultation and Coordination on China-India Border Affairs' (WMCC), (Note: According to ThePrint, "The WMCC is a joint secretary-level platform established in 2012 for border management between the countries and to share views on strengthening communication and cooperation, including between border security personnel.") and meetings and communication between their respective foreign and defense ministers. On 12 January 2022, the 14th corps-commander-level meeting at Chushul-Moldo Border Personnel Meeting (BPM) point took place. Following the Galwan Valley skirmish on 15 June, some Indian campaigns about boycotting Chinese products were started. Action on the economic front included cancellation and additional scrutiny of certain contracts with Chinese firms, and calls were also made to stop the entry of Chinese companies into strategic markets in India. By November 2020, the Indian government had banned over 200 Chinese apps, including apps owned by Alibaba, Tencent, Baidu, Sina, and Bytedance.

On 3 December 2024, Indian Union Minister of External Affairs S. Jaishankar announced in Lok Sabha that "disengagement has now been achieved in full in Eastern Ladakh".

=== Kyrgyzstan–Tajikistan ===
Batken Region in Kyrgyzstan.

On 28 April, Tajikistan and Kyrgyzstan forces on the Kyrgyzstan–Tajikistan border near Kök-Tash, Leilek, started the clashes, resulting in four deaths and dozens of injuries. The following day clashes resumed, with at least 41 people killed from both sides and roughly 10,000 people evacuated. The same day the foreign ministers of Tajikistan and Kyrgyzstan agreed to a ceasefire at the border. On 30 April, Tajikistan acknowledged the ceasefire in a statement published by its state information service.

=== Nagorno-Karabakh ===
The 2020 Nagorno-Karabakh war took place in the Nagorno-Karabakh region between the Republic of Artsakh backed by Armenia and Azerbaijan from September 2020 to November 2020. It is the latest escalation of the unresolved Nagorno-Karabakh conflict. A peace treaty was signed between Armenia, Azerbaijan, Artsakh, and Russia, ending hostilities on 10 November 2020. Widespread protests in Armenia followed the treaty while it was celebrated in Azerbaijan. Since the end of the 2020 War, Azerbaijan regularly violated the November ceasefire agreement, provoking cross-border fights with Armenia. The largest escalation occurred in September 2022, when Azerbaijan launched the largest attack on the Republic of Armenia in the history of the conflict between the two countries. Casualties were reported on both sides. Between 19 and 20 September 2023, Azerbaijan initiated a military offensive against the self-declared breakaway state of Artsakh. The offensive took place in the disputed region of Nagorno-Karabakh, which is internationally recognized as a part of Azerbaijan, but populated by Armenians. The attacks occurred in the midst of an escalating crisis caused by Azerbaijan blockading the Republic of Artsakh, which has resulted in significant scarcities of essential supplies such as food, medicine, and other goods in the affected region.

=== Persian Gulf ===
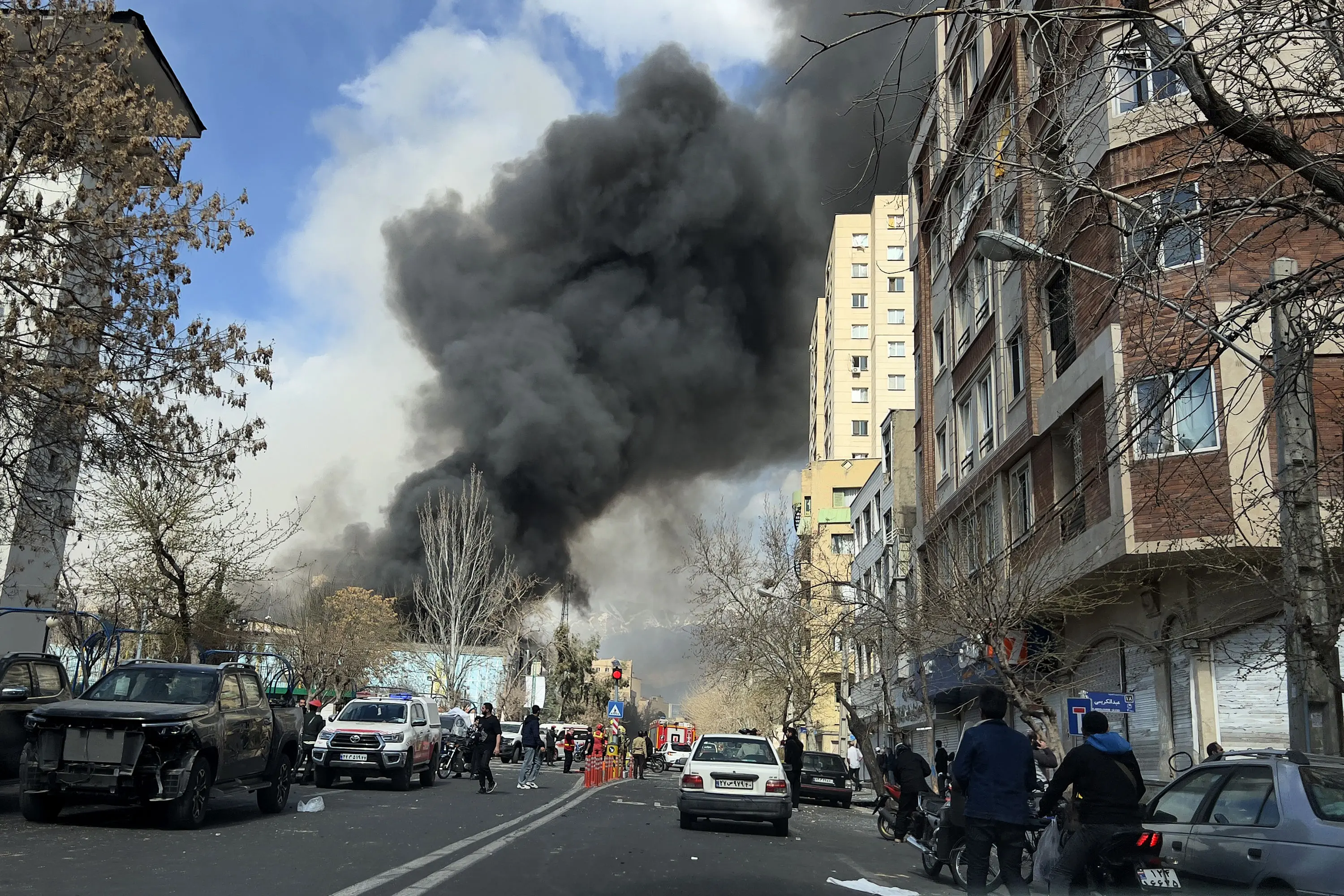
Residents in Tehran on the third day of U.S.-Israeli airstrikes, 3 March 2026

The 2019–2021 Persian Gulf crisis has led to the attack on the United States embassy in Baghdad during the start of the decade, the subsequent assassination of Qasem Soleimani by the United States days later, the Iranian attack on U.S. forces in Iraq in revenge, as well as the accidental shootdown of Ukraine International Airlines Flight 752 by Iran soon after.

=== Syrian civil war ===
The Syrian civil war was an armed conflict that began with the Syrian revolution in March 2011, when popular discontent with the Ba'athist regime ruled by Bashar al-Assad triggered large-scale protests and pro-democracy rallies across Syria, as part of the wider Arab Spring. The Assad regime responded to the protests with lethal force, which led to a series of defections, the emergence of armed opposition groups, and the civilian uprising descending into a civil war. The war lasted almost 14 years and culminated in the fall of the Assad regime in December 2024. Many sources regard this as the end of the civil war even though clashes have continued into 2026.

The Syrian opposition to Bashar al-Assad began as an insurgency, forming groups such as the Free Syrian Army (FSA). Anti-Assad forces received arms and training from Qatar, Turkey, a United States-led program, and others. Pro-Assad forces received financial and military support from Iran, Russia, and Hezbollah: Iran launched a military intervention in support of the Syrian government in 2013, and Russia followed in 2015. By this time, rebels had established the Syrian Interim Government after capturing the regional capitals of Raqqa in 2013 and Idlib in 2015. Use of chemical weapons during the war, predominantly by Syrian government forces, was the deadliest since the Iran–Iraq War. The Ghouta sarin attack was followed by unsuccessful international attempts to eliminate Syria's chemical weapons through military action or diplomacy.

In 2014, the Islamic State (IS) seized control over Eastern Syria and Western Iraq, prompting a United States-led coalition to launch an aerial bombing campaign against the IS, while providing ground support and supplies to the Syrian Democratic Forces (SDF), a Kurdish-dominated coalition led by the People's Defense Units (YPG). In 2016, Turkey launched an invasion of northern Syria in response to the creation of the Kurdish-led Autonomous Administration of North and East Syria (Rojava), while also establishing the Syrian National Army (SNA) to help it fight ISIS and pro-Assad forces.

The 2016 victory of the Syrian Arab Army (SAA) and other pro-Assad forces in the four-year Battle of Aleppo marked the recapture of what had been Syria's largest city before the war. In Idlib Governorate, the Hay'at Tahrir al-Sham (HTS) militia formed the Syrian Salvation Government, a technocratic, Islamist administration that governed the region from 2017 until 2024. Meanwhile, IS was territorially defeated in the Syrian Desert, Central Syria, Raqqa, and Deir ez-Zor campaigns. In December 2019, the SAA and its allies launched an offensive on Idlib province, which resulted in a ceasefire lasting from 2020 until November 2024. During this period, there were regular clashes between pro-Assad forces and HTS.

HTS launched a major offensive in November 2024, joined by the SNA. Aleppo fell in three days as the SAA began to collapse, giving momentum to revolutionaries across the country. HTS soon captured Hama and began to advance south towards Homs. Southern rebels and the Syrian Free Army launched their own offensive, capturing Daraa, Suwayda, and Palmyra. On 8 December, Bashar al-Assad fled to Moscow as Homs fell to HTS while southern rebels entered Damascus. Assad's prime minister remained in Damascus and transferred power to a provisional government. Israel launched an invasion of Syria's Quneitra Governorate (including the UN buffer zone) from its 58-year occupation of the Syrian Golan Heights.

At the Syrian Revolution Victory Conference held at the Presidential Palace in Damascus in January 2025, the new government announced the dissolution of several armed militias and their integration into the Syrian Ministry of Defense, as well as the appointment of former HTS leader Ahmed al-Sharaa as president of Syria. Later that year, a Druze insurgency formed in the southern Suweida Governorate following clashes with the government and alleged sectarian violence.

=== Russian invasion of Ukraine ===
2022 Russian invasion of Ukraine
- Part of the Russo-Ukrainian war
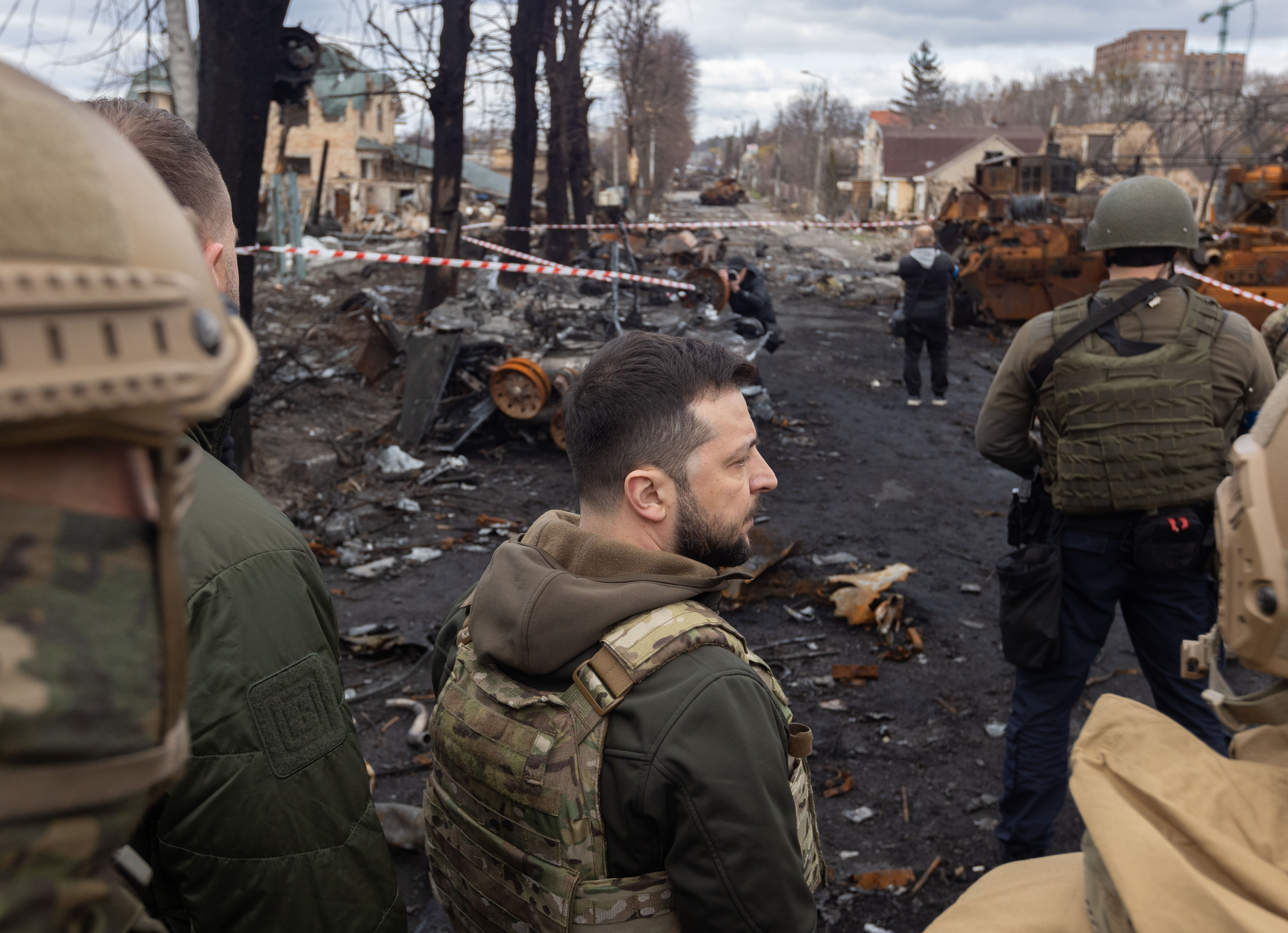
- Volodymyr Zelenskyy at the aftermath of the Bucha massacre, 4 April 2022
Date	24 February – 8 April 2022 (1 month, 2 weeks and 1 day)
Location	Ukraine
Result	Russian strategic failure

Belligerents
Russia; Belarus (Note: Belarus's logistical support for Russian forces, particularly allowing Russian forces to launch offensive operations against Ukraine from Belarusian territory in 2022, has been characterised as belligerency on the part of Belarus in this conflict by numerous analysts, including those published by the ISW, the IISS, and OSW.)	Ukraine (Note: See § Support for Ukraine for more details.)

Commanders and leaders
Vladimir Putin; Aleksandr Dvornikov; Aleksandr Lapin; Aleksandr Chaiko; Alexander Zhuravlyov	Volodymyr Zelenskyy; Valerii Zaluzhnyi; Oleksandr Syrskyi

Units involved
Order of battle	Order of battle

Strength
Pre-invasion at border: 150,000–200,000; Pre-invasion total: 900,000 military 554,000 paramilitary	Pre-invasion total: 196,600 military 102,000 paramilitary

Casualties and losses
- Reports vary widely; see Casualties for details.

On 24 February 2022, during the Russo-Ukrainian war, Russia launched a full-scale invasion of Ukraine, starting the current phase of the war, the largest conflict in Europe since World War II. By April 2022, the invasion's initial goal of a rapid Russian victory via decapitation had failed, with Ukraine pushing back the northern arm of the invasion and preventing the capture of Kyiv. Following this, the war transitioned to more conventional fighting in the south and east of Ukraine.

In a televised address, Russian president Vladimir Putin announced the invasion, calling it a "special military operation". He said that its purpose was to support the Russian-backed breakaway republics of Donetsk and Luhansk, whose paramilitary forces had been fighting Ukraine in the war in Donbas since 2014. Putin espoused irredentist and imperialist views challenging Ukraine's legitimacy as a state, baselessly claimed that the Ukrainian government were neo-Nazis committing genocide against the Russian minority in the Donbas, and said that Russia's goal was to "demilitarise and denazify" Ukraine.

In late 2021, Russia massed troops near Ukraine's borders and issued demands to the West including a ban on Ukraine ever joining the NATO military alliance. After repeatedly denying having plans to attack Ukraine, on 24 February 2022, Russian air strikes and a ground invasion were launched on a northern front from Belarus towards the capital Kyiv, a southern front from Crimea, and an eastern front from the Donbas and towards Kharkiv. Ukraine enacted martial law, ordered a general mobilisation, and severed diplomatic relations with Russia.

Russia's invasion plan involved defeating Ukraine within ten days and capturing or killing its government, followed by "mopping up" operations, establishing filtration camps for Ukrainians, setting up occupation regimes, trying and executing people involved in the Revolution of Dignity, and annexation. Whilst the invasion failed its main goal of a rapid victory, as Ukraine pushed back the northern arm of the invasion and prevented the capture of Kyiv, Russia maintained a military occupation of the southeast of Ukraine, and several months after the invasion, unilaterally declared the annexation of four Ukrainian oblasts.

The invasion was met with widespread international condemnation. The United Nations General Assembly passed a resolution condemning the invasion and demanding a full Russian withdrawal. The International Court of Justice ordered Russia to halt military operations, and the Council of Europe expelled Russia. Many countries imposed sanctions on Russia and its ally Belarus and provided humanitarian and military aid to Ukraine. The Baltic states and Poland declared Russia a terrorist state. Protests occurred around the world, with anti-war protesters in Russia being met by mass arrests and greater media censorship. The International Criminal Court (ICC) opened an investigation into crimes against humanity, war crimes, abduction of Ukrainian children, and genocide against Ukrainians. The ICC issued arrest warrants for Putin and other Russian officials.

== Africa ==
During the early 2020s, various African countries experienced coup d'état's, including Mali in 2020 and 2021, Chad, Guinea, and Sudan in 2021, two in Burkina Faso in January and September in 2022, and in Niger and Gabon in 2023. The region also saw attempted coups in Niger and Sudan in 2021, Guinea–Bissau and The Gambia in 2022, and Sudan and Sierra Leone in 2023. The coups have been similar in nature; most came from dissatisfied militaries who criticised their respective government's handling of Islamic insurgents or protests. The incoming juntas also tend to have worse relations with the West, with many seeking support from either Russia and the Wagner Group or Turkey instead of France, who helped the countries fight against Islamic insurgents through Operation Barkhane. ECOWAS has tried to push back on the phenomenon, although unsuccessfully after Mali after the local coup in 2021, and Guinea on 8 September 2021, shortly after its coup. The Alliance of Sahel States is a mutual defense pact created between Mali, Niger, and Burkina Faso on 16 September 2023. The pact was created amid the 2023 Nigerien crisis, which had begun after the coup in Niger which ECOWAS threatened to militarily intervene against.

== Asia ==
BRICS leaders at the 18th BRICS Summit in New Delhi, India, 12 September 2026

As a result of the Arab Spring which began in 2011, which evolved into what some considered the Arab Winter, much of the region was riven by massive instability and conflict, with the Syrian, Libyan and Yemeni Civil Wars continuing into the 2020s. The 2018–2022 Arab protests in Algeria, Sudan, Iraq, Lebanon and Egypt were seen as a continuation of the Arab Spring.

The Arab Winter (Arabic: الشتاء العربي, romanized: ash-shitāʼ al-ʻarabī) is the resurgence of authoritarianism and Islamic extremism in some Arab countries in the 2010s in the aftermath of the Arab Spring. The term "Arab Winter" refers to the events across Arab League countries in the Middle East and North Africa, including the Syrian civil war, the Iraqi insurgency and subsequent war in Iraq, the Egyptian Crisis, the Libyan crisis including the first and second civil wars, and the Yemeni crisis including the Yemeni civil war.

The term was coined by Chinese political scientist Zhang Weiwei during a debate with American political scientist Francis Fukuyama on 27 June 2011. Fukuyama believed the Arab Spring movement would spread to China, while Zhang predicted the Arab Spring would soon turn into an Arab Winter.

According to scholars of the University of Warsaw, the Arab Spring fully devolved into the Arab Winter in 2014, four years after its onset. The Arab Winter is characterized by the emergence of multiple regional wars, mounting regional instability, economic and demographic decline of Arab countries, and ethno-religious sectarian strife. According to a study by the American University of Beirut, by the summer of 2014, the Arab Winter had resulted in nearly a quarter of a million deaths and millions of refugees. Perhaps the most significant event of the Arab Winter was the rise of the Islamic State, which controlled swathes of land in the region from 2014 to 2019.

In 2020, several armed conflicts that could be seen as results of the Arab Spring were ongoing. The Syrian civil war, as of mid-2020, had caused massive political instability and economic hardship in Syria, with the Syrian currency plunging to new lows. Further, as of mid-2020, a civil war and subsequent intervention by Saudi Arabia continued in Yemen.

== Europe ==
European Commission President Ursula von der Leyen and European Council President António Costa with Syrian President Ahmed Al-Sharaa, 9 January 2026

The European Union reduced in member states from 28 to 27 with the exit of the United Kingdom on January 31, 2020. The response to the COVID-19 pandemic caused a rift between Northern and Southern European member states over spending, with the former demanding more stringent measures to curb overspending, while the latter argued for more financial support in order to overcome the crisis. A key issue of contention was the issuing of so-called corona bonds. After a historic debt-sharing deal for economic stimulus was agreed to by the remaining countries, Hungary and Poland threatened to veto both it and the EU's budget unless a clause demanding the upholding of the rule of law by member states was dropped. A compromise was reached to pass the deal, which involved delaying the implementation of the clause.

== Americas ==
The pink tide showed signs of resurging following a series of violent protests against austerity measures and income inequality scattered throughout Latin America, including the 2019-2020 Chilean protests, 2019–2020 Colombian protests, 2018–19 Haitian protests, and the 2021 Colombian protests. This development was strengthened by the landslide victory of left-wing MAS and its presidential candidate Luis Arce in Bolivia in the 2020 Bolivian general election. The trend continued throughout 2021, when multiple left wing leaders won elections in Latin America. In the 2021 Peruvian general election, Peru elected the indigenous, socialist union leader Pedro Castillo. In November 2021, Honduras elected leftist president Xiomara Castro, and just weeks later, left-winger Gabriel Boric won the 2021 Chilean election.

Map of Latin America depicting the ruling party of each country by São Paulo Forum affiliation. Red depicts member parties (left-wing) and blue depicts non-member parties (right-wing) in 2011 (left), 2018 (center), and 2026 (right).

The pink tide (Spanish: marea rosa; Portuguese: onda rosa), or the turn to the left (Spanish: giro a la izquierda; Portuguese: virada à esquerda), was a political wave and turn towards left-wing governments in Latin America throughout the 21st century. As a term, both phrases are used in political analysis in the news media and elsewhere to refer to a move toward more economically progressive or socially progressive policies in the region. Such governments have been referred to as "left-of-centre", "left-leaning", and "radical social-democratic". They are also members of the São Paulo Forum, a conference of left-wing political parties and other organizations from the Americas.

The Latin American countries viewed as part of this ideological trend have been referred to as pink tide nations, with the term post-neoliberalism or socialism of the 21st century also being used to describe the movement. Elements of the movement have included a rejection of the Washington Consensus. At the same time, some pink tide governments, such as those of Argentina, Brazil, and Venezuela, have been varyingly characterized as being anti-American, prone to populism, as well as authoritarian, particularly in the case of Nicaragua and Venezuela by the 2010s, although many others remained democratic.

The pink tide was followed by the conservative wave, a political phenomenon that emerged in the early 2010s as a direct reaction to the pink tide. Some authors have proposed that there are multiple distinct pink tides rather than a single one, with the first pink tide happening during the late 1990s and early 2000s and a second pink tide encompassing the elections of the late 2010s to early 2020s. A resurgence of the pink tide was kicked off by Mexico in 2018 and Argentina in 2019 and further established by Bolivia in 2020, along with Peru, Honduras, and Chile in 2021, and then Colombia and Brazil in 2022, with Colombia electing the first left-wing president in their history. In 2023, centre-left Bernardo Arévalo secured a surprise victory in Guatemala. In 2024, Claudia Sheinbaum won the Mexican presidency in a landslide, a continuation of Andrés Manuel López Obrador's left-wing government, and Yamandú Orsi's victory in Uruguay marked a return to power for the Broad Front.

However, during the mid-2020s the second pink tide has been dissipating, with countries such as Argentina, Bolivia, Chile, Colombia, Honduras, Panama, and Peru electing right-leaning governments, leading to some believing a "second conservative wave" is now ongoing. The new trend was cemented by the strikes on Venezuela and the capture of president Nicolás Maduro in early January 2026, along with threats from US president Donald Trump towards the then Colombian president Gustavo Petro.

=== Argentina ===
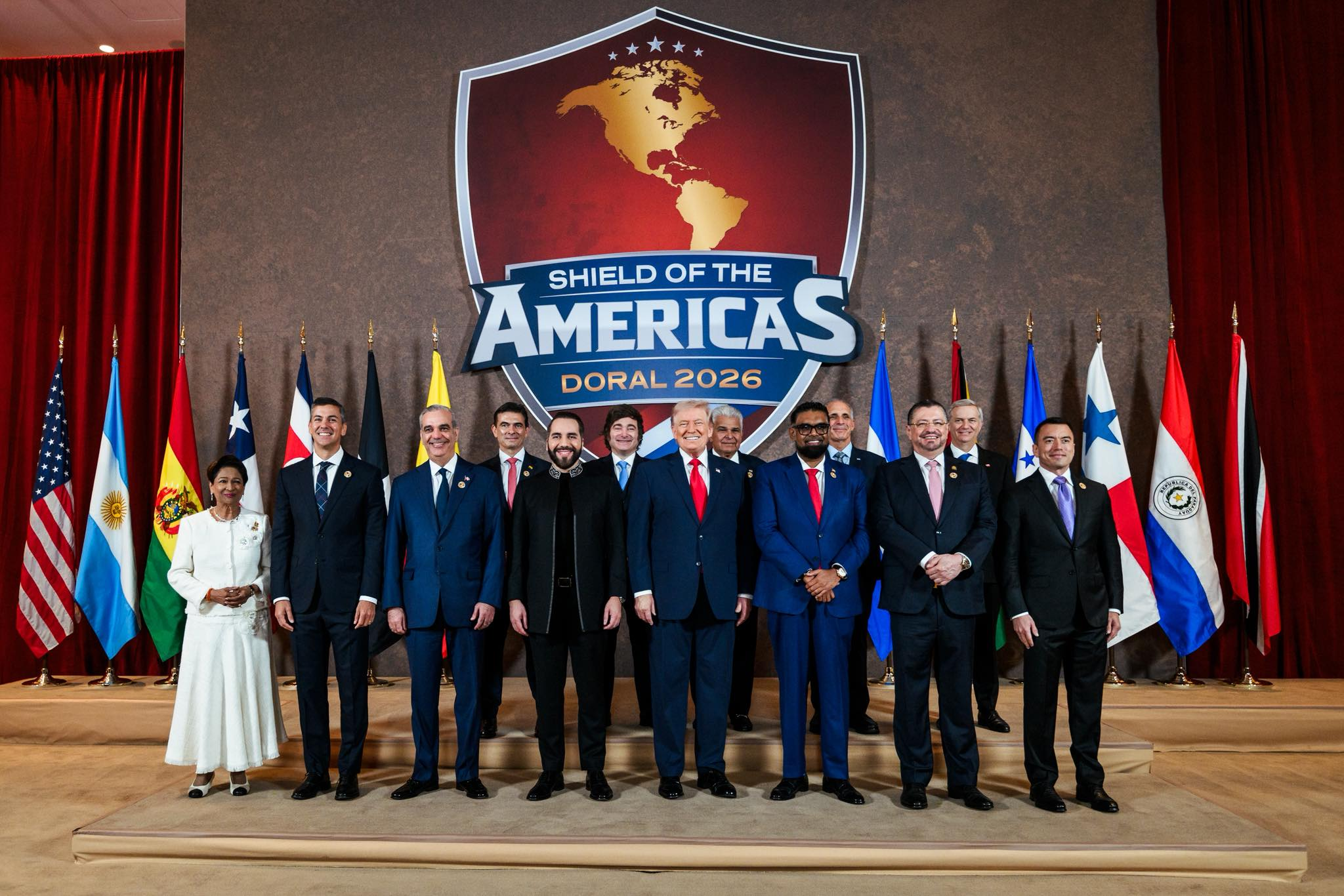
Javier Milei at the Shield of the Americas summit in March 2026

In 2021, at the request of Bolivia, Argentine prosecutors filed charges against former president Mauricio Macri, security minister Patricia Bullrich, defense minister Oscar Aguad and former Argentine ambassador to Bolivia Normando Álvarez García for allegedly supporting the removal of Evo Morales from power in November 2019. The Argentine government of that time was also accused of sending ammunition and weaponry to help the government of interim president Jeanine Áñez suppress protests organized by Morales's supporters.

=== Brazil ===
On March 30, 2021, the commanders of all three branches of the Brazilian Armed Forces – General Edson Leal Pujol (Army), Admiral Ilques Barbosa Junior (Navy), and Brigadier Antonio Carlos Moretti Bermudez (Air Force) – announced their intention to resign from their posts. The collective resignation announcement came less than a day after the dismissal of former Defence Minister Fernando Azevedo e Silva and was allegedly a move to signal the Armed Forces' opposition to any military interference in politics.

The 2021 Brazilian protests were popular demonstrations that took place in different regions of Brazil, in the context of the COVID-19 pandemic. Protests both supporting and opposing government happened. It was also the first time when sectors linked to the two antagonistic sides, such as the left and the right, began to protest against the government over a common goal, holding caravans on January 23 and 24, 2021.

On 8 January 2023, following the victory of Luiz Inácio Lula da Silva in the Brazilian general elections of October 2022, supporters of the previous president, Jair Bolsonaro, attacked the Supreme Court of Brazil, the National Congress of Brazil and the Planalto Presidential Palace in the Três Poderes Plaza in the capital, Brasília. Senator Veneziano Vital do Rêgo, interim president of the Federal Senate, confirmed that rioters had breached the Chamber of Deputies' Green Hall and attempted to enter the Planalto Palace. Lula was not in Brasília at the time of the attack, and neither was Bolsonaro, who left Brazil for Orlando, United States, before Lula's inauguration.

Jair Bolsonaro's tenure as the 38th president of Brazil began with his inauguration on 1 January 2019, and ended on 1 January 2023. Bolsonaro took office following his victory in the 2018 general election, defeating Fernando Haddad. His presidency ended after one term in office, following his defeat in the 2022 general election to Luiz Inácio Lula da Silva. In the years Brazil has been a democracy since 1985, Bolsonaro became the first president to lose an election as an incumbent.

His government was characterized by the strong presence of ministers with a military background, international alignment with the populist right and autocratic leaders, and was recognized for his anti-environmental, anti-indigenous people and pro gun policies. He was also responsible for a broad dismantling of cultural, scientific and educational government programmes, in addition to promoting repeated attacks on democratic institutions and spreading fake news. His government was responsible for a significant reduction in bureaucracy and modernization of public systems, with the fast-paced digitization of federal public services, through the creation of the digital platform "gov.br". Bolsonaro also sanctioned the Economic Freedom Act, reducing bureaucracy in economic activities and facilitating the opening and operation of businesses throughout the country, which proved very beneficial, especially for small companies.

During his administration crime dropped across the country and unemployment rates slowly fell, with the Brazilian GDP showing a moderate growth rate, averaging 1.5% per year. At the same time, job insecurity, (Note: Attributed to multiple sources:) inflation and hunger increased, while per capita income, social inequality and poverty reached its worst levels since 2012.

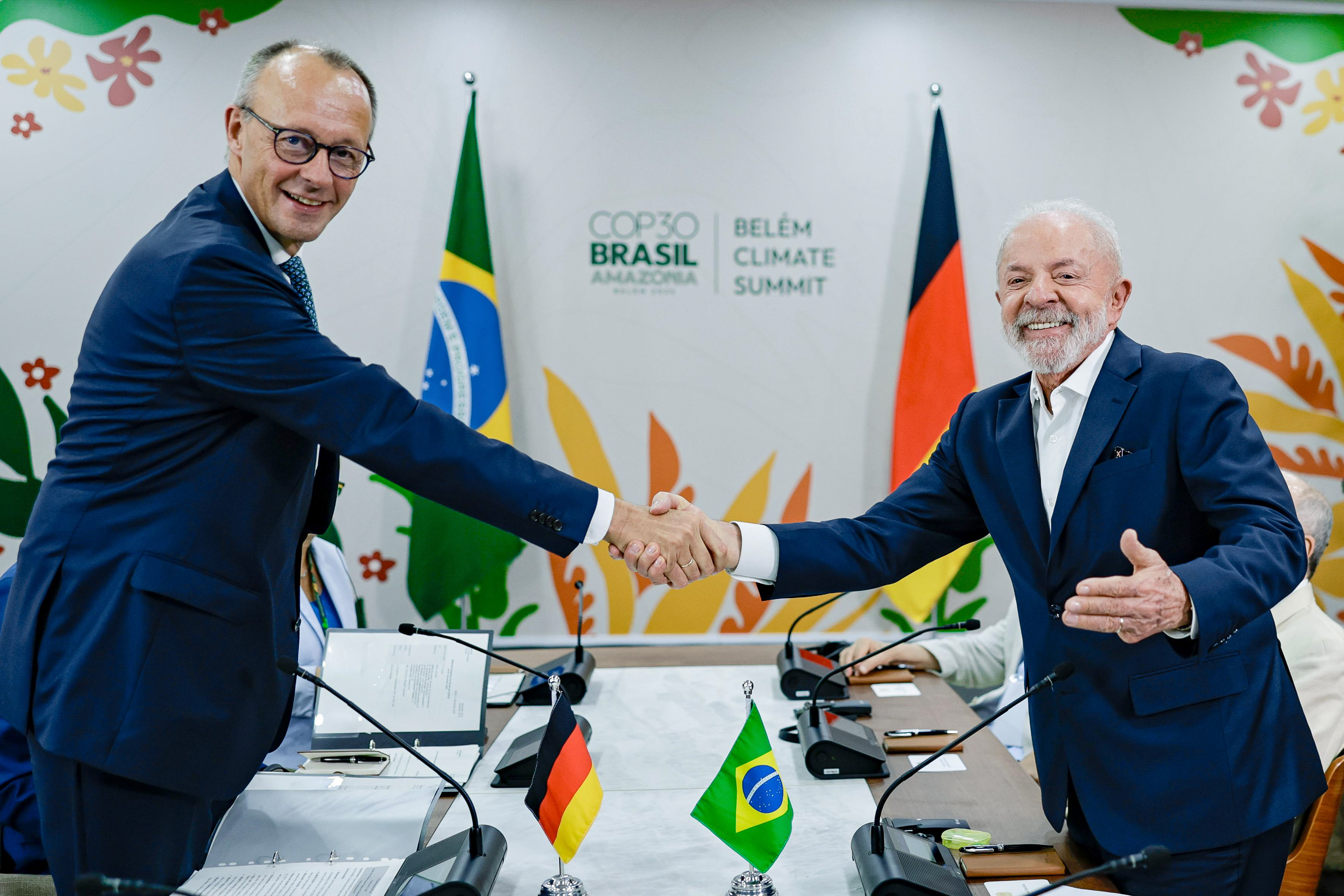
German Chancellor Friedrich Merz and Brazilian President Luiz Inácio Lula da Silva at the COP30 Climate Summit, in Belém, Brazil, 7 November 2025

The second presidency of Luiz Inácio Lula da Silva, also known as Lula's third government, began on 1 January 2023, when Luiz Inácio Lula da Silva returned to office for a third term as President of Brazil. A member of the Workers' Party (PT), Lula was elected in the second round of the 2022 presidential election, defeating incumbent president Jair Bolsonaro. He became the first Brazilian president to be elected to three terms and the first since Getúlio Vargas to return to the presidency after an interval between terms. The administration took office amid deep political polarization and the aftermath of the 2022–2023 Brazilian coup attempt, with the 8 January attacks on Brazil's government institutions constituting one of its first major political crises.

The administration has been characterized by the restoration and expansion of social and public policies, changes to Brazil's fiscal and tax framework, and efforts to strengthen the role of the federal government. Major economic measures included the approval of a consumption tax reform and the replacement of the previous spending cap with a new fiscal framework. The government recorded periods of economic growth and declining unemployment, while facing concerns over public debt, fiscal sustainability, interest rates, household indebtedness, corporate financial difficulties, and the rising cost of living, particularly food prices.

Lula's administration has also sought to restore Brazil's international role and expand its participation in multilateral diplomacy, while placing greater emphasis on environmental policy and efforts to combat deforestation. Brazil hosted the 2025 United Nations Climate Change Conference (COP30) in Belém. The government's foreign policy was also affected by international tensions and economic disputes, including the Brazil–United States diplomatic crisis of 2025–2026.

The administration has been marked by political controversies and debates over the regulation of digital platforms, disinformation, freedom of expression, and the protection of children online. Domestically, the government has faced challenges in its relationship with Congress and debates over public spending and economic policy. Initially composed of 37 ministries, the administration underwent changes to its ministerial structure and adopted a new government identity and slogan, "On the Side of the Brazilian People", in 2025.

=== Chile ===
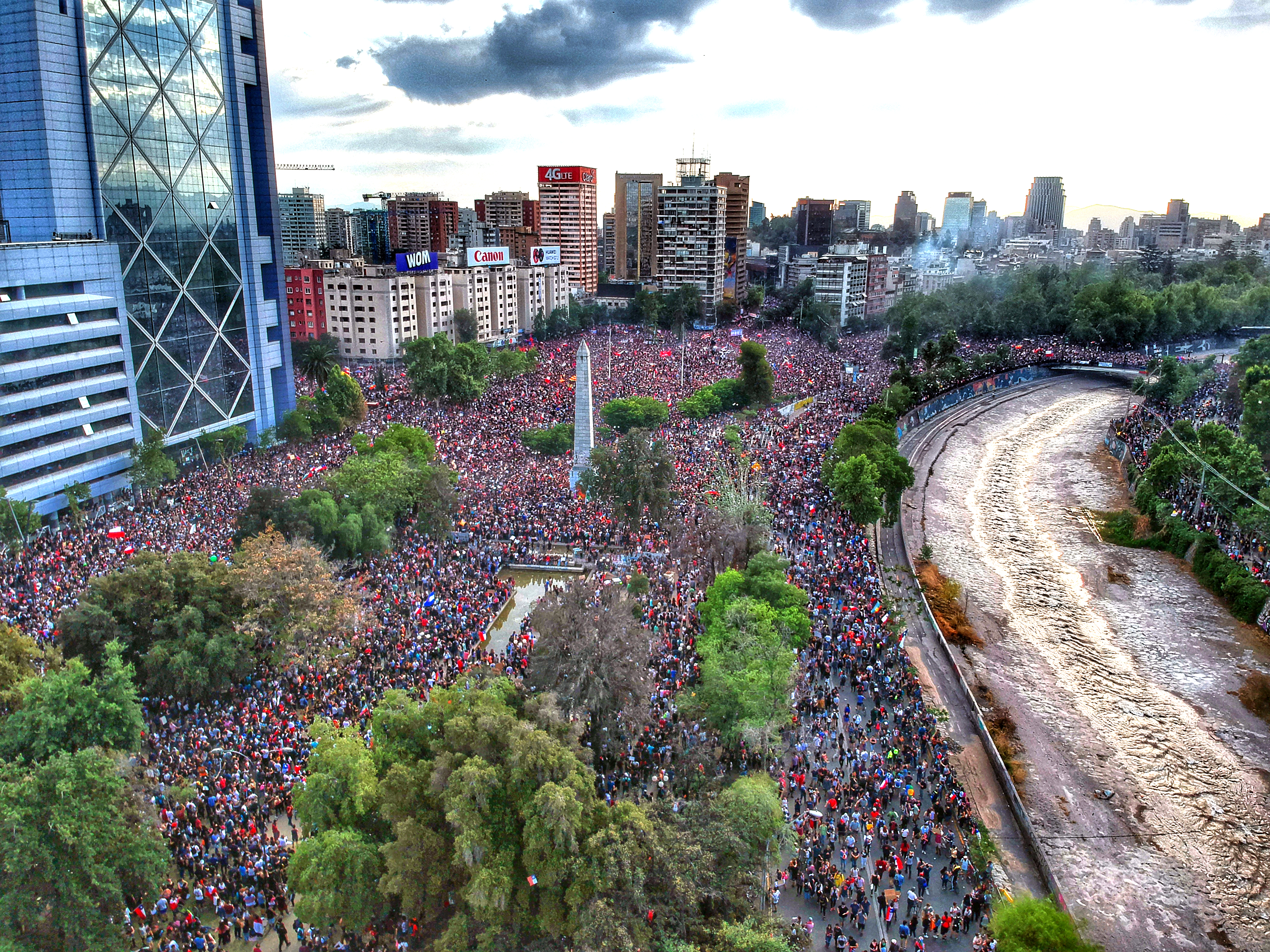
"La marcha más grande de Chile" in Santiago, during the 2019 Social Outburst

The 2019–2022 Chilean protests were a series of massive demonstrations and severe riots originated in Santiago and spread to all regions of Chile. The protests have been considered the "worst civil unrest" having occurred in Chile since the end of Augusto Pinochet's military dictatorship due to the scale of damage to public infrastructure, the number of protesters, and the measures taken by the government. On 25 October 2019, over 1.2 million people took to the streets of Santiago to protest against social inequality, demanding President Piñera's resignation, in what was called as "The biggest march of Chile." At least 29 people died, and nearly 2,500 were injured and 2,840 arrested.

On 15 November 2019, Chile's National Congress signed an agreement to hold a national referendum that would rewrite the constitution if it were to be approved. The referendum was rescheduled from April to October 2020 due to the COVID-19 pandemic in Chile. On 25 October 2020, Chileans voted 78.28 per cent in favor of a new constitution, while 21.72 per cent rejected the change. Voter turnout was 51 per cent. On 16 May 2021, the election of the 155 Chileans who will form the convention which will draft the new constitution was voted. On 21 December 2021, former students leader and constitutional agreement negotiator, 35-year old leftist Gabriel Boric, was elected president of Chile in the 2021 Chilean presidential election with 55,86% of the vote.

=== Colombia ===
The 2019–20 Colombian protests were a collection of protests that began on 21 November 2019. Hundreds of thousands of Colombians demonstrated for various reasons. Some protested against various proposed economic and political reforms proposed by the government of Iván Duque Márquez, others against the few violent protestors and in favor of the Colombian peace process, and other issues. Another series of protests began in Colombia on 28 April 2021 against increased taxes and health care reform proposed by the government of President Márquez.

After the presidential elections on 29 May 2022, with a runoff on 19 June 2022, Gustavo Petro, a senator and former Mayor of Bogota, defeated Rodolfo Hernández Suárez, former mayor of Bucaramanga, in the runoff election. Petro's victory made him the first left-wing candidate to be elected president of Colombia. Petro, a former AD/M-19 member, was chosen as a candidate of the Historic Pact for Colombia alliance. Petro's left-wing platform encompassed support for land reform, universal health care, continuing the Colombian peace process, and expanding social services.

=== Ecuador ===
On 7 April 2020, The Criminal Court of the National Court of Justice found the former president Rafael Correa guilty of aggravated passive bribery in 2012–2016. He was sentenced to 8 years in prison in absentia for leading the corruption network that between 2012 and 2016 received "undue contributions" at to finance his political movement in exchange for awarding state contracts to businessmen along with Alexis Mera, former Judiciary Secretary of the Presidency, former Ministry of Housing and Urban Development, María de los Angeles Duarte, former congresswoman Viviana Bonilla and former Constitutional Judge and his secretary Pamela Martínez.

A series of protests against the economic policies of Ecuadorian president Guillermo Lasso, triggered by increasing fuel and food prices, began on 13 June 2022. Initiated by and primarily attended by Indigenous activists, in particular the Confederation of Indigenous Nationalities of Ecuador (CONAIE), the protests were joined by students and workers who have also been affected by the price increases. Lasso condemned the protests and labelled them as an attempted "coup d'état" against his government.

A political crisis began in Ecuador on 17 May 2023 as a result of the impeachment trial against President Guillermo Lasso. The impeachment inquiry began in the National Assembly on 9 May and lasted until 17 May when Lasso dissolved parliament through the constitutional provision known as muerte cruzada ("mutual death"). This triggered the end of the impeachment inquiry as it dissolved the National Assembly and caused an earlier general election. This was the first time an Ecuadorian president had used this constitutional measure.

=== Peru ===
During the COVID-19 pandemic in Peru, President Vizcarra instituted stay-at-home orders and issued relief funds, but existing inequality, overcrowding and a largely informal economy saw Peru being heavily affected by the pandemic. As a result, Peru's gross domestic product declined thirty percent, increasing political pressure on Vizcarra's government. In September 2020, Congress opened impeachment proceedings against Vizcarra on grounds of "moral incapacity", accusing him of influence peddling after audio recordings were released by an opposition legislator, but the process did not receive enough votes to remove him from office.

On 9 November 2020, the Peruvian Congress impeached Vizcarra a second time, after declaring him "morally incompetent"; he was removed from office. The president of Congress, Manuel Merino, succeeded him as President of Peru the following day. Vizcarra's removal from office was seen as a coup by many Peruvians, political analysts and media outlets in the country, resulting in the beginning of the 2020 Peruvian protests. Following the deaths of protesters, Merino resigned after only five days. The new president chosen by the legislature was Francisco Sagasti, a former World Bank official characterised as a "centrist technocrat".

After the 2021 Peruvian general election won by Pedro Castillo, the candidate of the Marxist Free Peru party, runner-up Keiko Fujimori disseminated claims of electoral fraud. Observers from the Inter-American Union of Electoral Organizations, the Organization of American States, and the Progressive International denied any instances of widespread fraud and praised the accuracy of the elections. A letter signed by almost one-hundred retired officers of the Peruvian armed forces was written calling on current military leaders in Peru to refuse recognizing the election of Castillo into the presidency. President Francisco Sagasti condemned the letter, stating: "They want to incite top commanders of the Army, Navy, and Air force to break the rule of law."

Since taking office, Castillo distanced himself from Free Peru, adopted more moderate left-wing cabinets and was later described as holding conservative or right-wing political positions. Going through four cabinets in a little over six months and his choice of appointing close acquaintances as officials led to his government facing the most unstable beginning in more than twenty years, with questions arising about his apparent inexperience for office. Following failed impeachment proceeding in December 2021 and March 2022, a transportation union leader who previously cooperated with politicians and businessmen to destabilize Castillo's government helped organize a general strike that expanded into the 2022 Peruvian protests.

On 7 December 2022, President of Peru Pedro Castillo attempted to dissolve Congress in the face of imminent impeachment proceedings by the legislative body because of profiting off of government contracts, immediately enacting a curfew, establishing an emergency government and calling for a constituent assembly. The act was recognized by politicians, the Constitutional Court of Peru and media as a coup d'état, with some comparing it to the autogolpe of Alberto Fujimori during the 1992 Peruvian self-coup d'état. Numerous members of Castillo's government resigned from their positions shortly after he announced the dissolution of Congress, and the Peruvian Armed Forces also refused to support his actions.

=== Venezuela ===
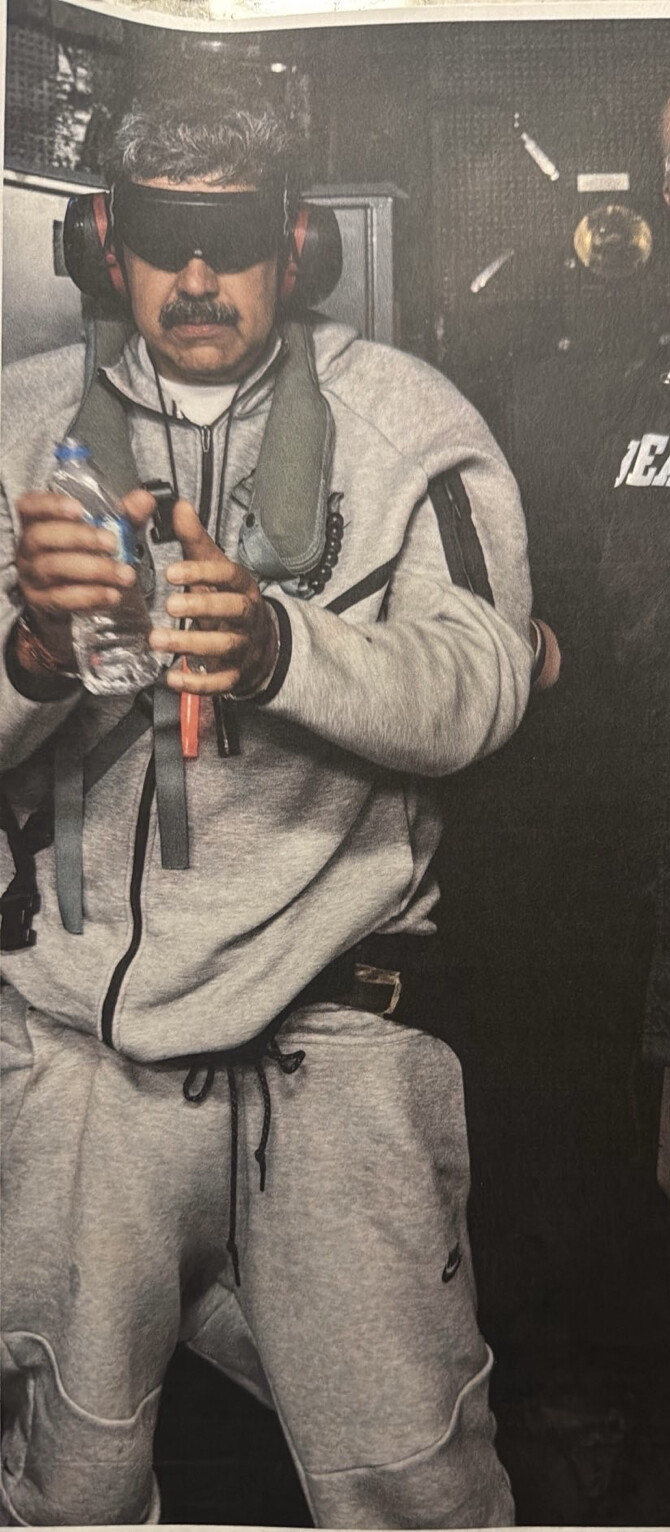
Nicolas Maduro following his capture, on board USS Iwo Jima

The Crisis in Venezuela and its presidential crisis continued in 2020.

On 5 January, the 2020 Venezuelan National Assembly Delegated Committee election was disputed between Luis Parra and opposition leader Juan Guaidó. On 19 January, Guaidó left Venezuela and arrived in Colombia, planning to meet with Mike Pompeo, as well as traveling to Europe and the United States later.

On 26 March, the Department of State declared a $15 million bounty on Nicolás Maduro, as well as $10 million each on Diosdado Cabello, Hugo Carvajal, Clíver Alcalá Cordones and Tareck El Aissami, for charges of drug trafficking and narco-terrorism. Following this, Clíver Alcalá, a former general residing in Colombia, published a video claiming responsibility for a stockpile of weapons and military equipment seized in Colombia. According to Alcalá, he had made a contract with Guaidó and "American advisers" in order to buy weapons to remove Maduro. Alcalá did not present any evidence and Guaidó rejected the allegations. After wishing farewell to his family, Alcalá surrendered to US authorities on 27 March.

On 3 May, eight former Venezuelan soldiers were killed and seventeen rebels were captured on 3 May, including two American security contractors, after approximately 60 men landed in Macuto and tried to invade Venezuela. The members of the naval attack force were employed as private military contractors by Silvercorp USA and the operation aimed to depose Maduro from power.

== Oceania ==
=== Australia ===
During the COVID-19 pandemic, the National Cabinet was established while Australia received praise during 2020 for being one of the few Western countries to successfully suppress the virus, though the slow pace of the COVID-19 vaccination rollout was criticized. In 2021, the country joined the AUKUS security pact amid increased tensions between Australia and China The Morrison government was defeated at the 2022 Australian federal election, with Scott Morrison subsequently announcing he would resign as the leader of the Liberal Party.

Anthony Norman Albanese (Note: Pronounced /ˌælbəˈniːzi/ AL-bə-NEE-zee or /ˈælbəniːz/ AL-bə-neez; Italian: [al.baˈne.ze]. Both pronunciations have been used by Albanese himself during his life; they have both been in common use among other speakers at various stages. While Albanese always used /ˈælbəniːz/ throughout his early life, he later began using /ˌælbəˈniːzi/.) (born 2 March 1963) is an Australian politician who has served as the 31st prime minister of Australia since 2022. He has been the leader of the Labor Party since 2019 and the member of Parliament (MP) for the New South Wales division of Grayndler since 1996.

Born in Sydney, Albanese attended St Mary's Cathedral College and studied economics at the University of Sydney. As a student, he joined the Labor Party and later worked as a party official and research officer before entering Parliament. He was elected to the House of Representatives at the 1996 federal election, winning the seat of Grayndler in Inner West Sydney. He was appointed to the shadow cabinet in 2001 by Simon Crean. After Labor's victory in the 2007 election, Albanese was appointed Leader of the House, and was also made Minister for Regional Development and Local Government and Minister for Infrastructure and Transport, a role he retained after Kevin Rudd was replaced as prime minister by Julia Gillard in 2010. He supported Rudd's challenges against Gillard in 2012 and 2013. Following a final leadership ballot in June 2013, which saw Rudd return as prime minister, Albanese was elected the deputy leader of the Labor Party and sworn in as deputy prime minister the following day, a position he held for less than three months, as Labor was defeated at the 2013 election.

After the party's election defeat, Albanese stood for leadership of the Labor Party against Bill Shorten in a leadership election. Although Albanese won a large majority of the membership, Shorten received more support from Labor MPs and became leader. Shorten subsequently appointed Albanese to his Shadow Cabinet. After Labor's surprise defeat in the 2019 election, Shorten resigned as leader, with Albanese becoming the only person nominated in the leadership election to replace him; he was subsequently elected unopposed as leader of the Labor Party, becoming Leader of the Opposition. He led the party to victory at the 2022 election, defeating the Liberal–National Coalition.

In his first term, Albanese led his government's response to a cost-of-living crisis caused by the 2021–2023 inflation surge, held an unsuccessful referendum to enshrine an Indigenous Voice to Parliament in the Constitution, updated Australia's climate targets to reach carbon neutrality by 2050, oversaw an acceleration of renewable energy projects, made major changes to industrial relations laws, enacted the Future Made in Australia industrial policy, created the National Anti-Corruption Commission, introduced a ban on children under sixteen from using social media platforms, established the Royal Commission into the Robodebt Scheme and expanded access to paid parental leave and subsidised childcare. In foreign policy, Albanese pledged further logistical support to Ukraine to assist with the Russo-Ukrainian war, attempted to strengthen relations in the Pacific region, and oversaw an easing of tensions and trade restrictions put on Australia by China. He also administered the official commencement of the AUKUS security pact between Australia, the United States, and the United Kingdom, and navigated Australia's response to the Gaza war.

Albanese's government was re-elected in a landslide victory in the 2025 election, resulting in one of the largest Labor governments in Australian history. In his second term, Albanese's government reduced university education fees, responded to Australia's housing unaffordability crisis, set the country's first 2035 emissions reduction targets, established the National Environmental Protection Agency and Centre for Disease Control, responded to the 2025 Bondi Beach shooting and the oil crisis caused by 2026 Iran war, and initiated the Royal Commission on Antisemitism and Social Cohesion. On matters of foreign policy, his government recognised the State of Palestine, responded to President Donald Trump's tariffs, pledged support for US and Israeli attacks on Iran and finalised a free trade agreement with the European Union. Despite being ideologically aligned with the Labor Left faction, Labor has shifted towards the political centre during Albanese's tenure as prime minister.

=== Kiribati ===
A constitutional crisis began in Kiribati when the Cabinet of Kiribati suspended two of its Court Justices. High Court Judge David Lambourne was suspended in May 2022 while Chief Justice Bill Hastings was suspended on 30 June 2022, both over allegations of misconduct. A court ruling overturned the suspension and subsequent deportation of Lambourne. In response, the government suspended all judges from the Kiribati Court of Appeal on 6 September 2022.

=== New Zealand ===
In the 2020 New Zealand general election, the governing Labour Party, led by incumbent Prime Minister Jacinda Ardern won the election in a landslide victory against the National Party, led by Judith Collins. It was the first time a New Zealand political party has secured a majority government under the mixed-member proportional representation (MMP) system introduced in 1996. Labour also achieved the highest percentage of the popular vote (49.1%) for any political party since the 1951 general election (where the then-National Party won 54.0% of the popular vote). Labour also achieved its third-highest ever percentage of the popular vote (49.1%) in its political history, surpassed only by its previous general election victories of 1938 (55.8%) and 1946 (51.3%). Conversely in this election, the National Party obtained the second-lowest ever percentage of the popular vote (26.79%) in its history, second only to the lowest percentage obtained in 2002 (20.93%).

==== Governments ====
Dame Jacinda Kate Laurell Ardern (/ɑːrˈdɜːrn/ ah-DURN; born 26 July 1980) is a New Zealand activist and former politician who served as prime minister of New Zealand and leader of the Labour Party from 2017 to 2023. She was a member of Parliament (MP) as a list MP from 2008 to 2017 and for Mount Albert from 2017 to 2023.

Born and raised in Hamilton, Ardern grew up in Morrinsville and Murupara. She joined the New Zealand Labour Party at the age of 17. After graduating from the University of Waikato in 2001, Ardern worked as a researcher in the office of then-New Zealand Prime Minister Helen Clark. She later worked in London as an adviser in the Cabinet Office during Tony Blair's premiership. In 2008, Ardern was elected president of the International Union of Socialist Youth. Ardern was first elected as an MP in the 2008 general election, when Labour lost power after nine years. She was later elected to represent the Mount Albert electorate in a by-election on 25 February 2017.

Ardern was unanimously elected as deputy leader of the Labour Party on 1 March 2017, after the resignation of Annette King. Exactly five months later, with an election due, Labour's leader Andrew Little resigned after a historically low opinion polling result for the party, with Ardern elected unopposed as leader in his place. Labour's support increased rapidly after Ardern became leader, and she led her party to gain 14 seats at the 2017 general election on 23 September, winning 46 seats to the National Party's 56. After negotiations, New Zealand First chose to enter a minority coalition government with Labour, supported by the Green Party, with Ardern as prime minister. She was sworn in by the governor-general on 26 October 2017. She became the world's youngest female head of government at age 37. Ardern gave birth to her daughter on 21 June 2018, making her the world's second elected head of government to give birth while in office (after Benazir Bhutto).

Ardern describes herself as a social democrat and a progressive. The Sixth Labour Government faced challenges from the New Zealand housing crisis, child poverty, and social inequality. In March 2019, in the aftermath of the Christchurch mosque shootings, Ardern reacted by rapidly introducing strict gun laws. Throughout 2020 she led New Zealand's response to the COVID-19 pandemic, for which she won praise for New Zealand being one of few Western nations to successfully contain the virus. Ardern moved the Labour Party further to the centre towards the October 2020 general election, promising to cut spending during the remainder of the COVID-19 recession. She led the Labour Party to a landslide victory, gaining an overall majority of 65 seats in Parliament, the first time a majority government had been formed since 1996.

Facing declining popularity and increasing criticism over the government's handling of key issues such as the economy, housing, child poverty and the pandemic, Ardern announced on 19 January 2023, that she would resign as Labour leader, stating that she did not "have enough in the tank". Ardern resigned as leader of the Labour Party on 22 January and submitted her resignation as prime minister three days later. Rising costs of living and concerns that the government's focus on health measures overshadowed effective economic recovery fuelled public backlash against the Labour Party in the 2023 general election.

Christopher John Hipkins (born 5 September 1978) is a New Zealand politician who has served as leader of the New Zealand Labour Party since January 2023 and leader of the Opposition since November 2023. He was the 41st prime minister of New Zealand from January to November 2023, previously serving as the minister for the public service and minister for education from 2017 to 2023, the minister for health for several months in 2020, and the COVID-19 response from 2020 to 2022. He has been the member of Parliament (MP) for Remutaka since the 2008 general election.

Hipkins was born and raised in the Hutt Valley in Wellington. He was heavily involved in student politics while at Victoria University of Wellington and was elected president of VUWSA twice, in 2000 and 2001. He stood for the typically safe Labour seat of Remutaka in the Hutt Valley in 2008 and won it, albeit by a small margin due to an increased vote for the National Party across the country. After Jacinda Ardern led Labour to victory in the 2017 general election, Hipkins assumed multiple portfolios within the Sixth Labour Government, serving variously as minister of education, police, the public service, and leader of the House. For his perceived competence within multiple roles and responsibilities, he became regarded as Labour's "fixer".

As minister of health, Hipkins was responsible for the government's response to the COVID-19 pandemic in New Zealand. The elimination policy became the primary focus of the 2020 election, helping Labour win in a landslide. After the victory, Hipkins took on more responsibility, serving as minister for COVID-19 response from November 2020 to June 2022.

After Ardern announced her resignation as leader of the Labour Party, Hipkins was elected unopposed, and consequently became prime minister on 25 January 2023. His premiership was faced almost immediately with the 2023 Auckland Anniversary Weekend floods, and then by further flooding from Cyclone Gabrielle. He led his party into the 2023 general election, with Labour losing to National. He became Opposition leader on 27 November 2023.

=== Samoa ===
A constitutional crisis began in Samoa on 22 May 2021 when the O le Ao o le Malo (Head of State) Tuimalealiʻifano Vaʻaletoʻa Sualauvi II issued a proclamation purporting to prevent the Legislative Assembly of Samoa from meeting in the wake of the 2021 Samoan general election. Court rulings had upheld the election results, giving a parliamentary majority to the Faʻatuatua i le Atua Samoa ua Tasi (FAST) party, led by Fiamē Naomi Mataʻafa. On 24 May 2021, a makeshift ceremony was held outside of Parliament to swear in Mataʻafa as prime minister. On 23 July the Court of Appeal declared that the ceremony was binding and that FAST had been the government since that date.

=== Solomon Islands ===
The 2021 Solomon Islands unrest was a series of demonstrations and violent riots in the Solomon Islands, which began on 24 November 2021. Australia responded to the unrest by deploying Australian Federal Police and Australian Defence Force personnel following a request from the Sogavare government under the Australia–Solomon Islands Bilateral Security Treaty.

== See also ==
See also

General overviews

- Political history of the world
- 21st century
- List of protests in the 21st century

Specific issues and topics

- Brexit negotiations
- Coronavirus disease 2019

Country and regional entries and timelines

- 2020 in the United States
- 2020 in United States politics and government
- 2020 in the Caribbean
- 2020 in Central America
- 2020 in East Africa
- 2020 in West Africa

Related decade overviews

- 2020s decade overviews:
  - 2020s in United Kingdom political history
  - 2020s in United States political history

Categories

== Bibliography ==
- D'Anieri, Paul (23 March 2023). Ukraine and Russia. Cambridge: Cambridge University Press. ISBN 978-1-009-31550-0. OCLC 1350843759.
- Middleton, Karen (2016). Albanese: Telling It Straight. Random House Australia. ISBN 9781925324730.
- Ramani, Samuel (13 April 2023). Putin's War on Ukraine: Russia's Campaign for Global Counter-Revolution. Hurst Publishers. ISBN 978-1-80526-003-5.
