= Wildlife of Kiribati =

The wildlife of Kiribati is the responsibility of the Wildlife Conservation Unit of the Ministry of Environment, Lands and Agriculture Developments.

== Animals ==
=== Birds ===
Ninety species of birds have been recorded in Kiribati, of which two are endemic and three have been introduced by humans. In 1980, Christmas Island was home to 18 nesting species, including around 15 million sooty terns, as well as five species of petrels and shearwaters, while the uninhabited Malden and Starbuck Islands were host to ground-nesting terns, frigatebirds and boobies.

The Henderson petrel and Kiritimati reed-warbler (locally called bokikokiko) are both listed as endangered on the IUCN Red List.

=== Reptiles ===
Two species of marine turtle have been positively identified in Kiribati waters:

- Green turtle (locally called te on)
- Hawksbill turtle (locally called te tabakea or te borauea)

The following marine turtle species have also been reported to occur in Kiribati waters, but only through descriptions:

- Loggerhead sea turtle (locally called te on n ae),
- Olive ridley (locally called te on mron)
- Leatherback (locally called te kabi n waa)

=== Fish ===
There are about 500 fish species found around the Phoenix Islands.

The Kiribati islands are located in the central Pacific Ocean, making it abundant in rare animal species native to these islands. The islands host triggerfish (Xanthichthys greenei) that reside in greater depths of the ocean. Candy scale picnic gobies (Trimma squamicana) are more rare in other parts of the world, but are fairly common on the islands. They are light in color and are found at depths of 30 to 150 feet. The y-barred sandperch (Parapercis lata), is a shallow-dwelling fish with a white body and patches of red.

=== Mammals ===
Most are marine mammals, e.g. whales, dolphins, etc. On land, the Polynesian rat and the Tanezumi rat were introduced to the island.

=== Invertebrates ===
There are about 200 species of coral found around the Phoenix Islands.

== Vegetation ==
Breadfruit, coconut, mango and screwpine are cultivated.

Several species of mangrove tree predominate in the shallow lagoon waters: Rhizophora mucronata, Bruguiera gymnorhiza, Sonneratia alba and Lumnitzera littorea. Inland forests have Pisonia grandis, Hernandia nymphaeifolia and Neisosperma oppositifolia in wetter locations and Calophyllum inophyllum in drier ones. There are also Tournefortia argentea and Pisonia grandis trees. Shrubs found on seaward beach ridges include: Tournefortia argentea, Pandanus tectorius, Guettarda speciosa and Scaevola taccadal.

== Conservation ==
There are 13 protected areas in Kiribati.

The Phoenix Islands Protected Area is the largest in the world, encompassing 408,250 square kilometres (157,630 sq mi) of water and land, with "about 200 coral species, 500 fish species, 18 marine mammals and 44 bird species".

== See also ==
- List of birds of Kiribati
- List of mammals of Kiribati
