= Kiribati (disambiguation) =

Kiribati is a nation in the Pacific Ocean.

Kiribati may also refer to:

- I-Kiribati, a person from Kiribati, or of Kiribati descent
- Kiribati language or Gilbertese

== See also ==
- Outline of Kiribati
