= David Lambourne =

Australian judge in Kiribati (born 1967)

David Lambourne (born 20 March 1967 in Launceston, Tasmania) is an Australian judge on the courts of Kiribati since 1995, first as Kiribati People's lawyer (1995–1999), solicitor general, then, since July 2018, as puisne judge Justice in the High Court of Kiribati. He is the husband of Tessie Eria Lambourne, leader of the opposition since 2020.

In February 2020, David Lambourne left Kiribati to attend a conference in Australia; however, he was stranded due to the COVID-19 pandemic. The Kiribati government then attempted to prevent him from assuming his position in Tarawa by ceasing his wages, refusing to issue an ongoing work permit, and preventing him from boarding a repatriation flight. In November 2021, a court ruling by Chief Justice Bill Hastings overturned the government's actions, declaring them unconstitutional. In response, Attorney General Tetiro Semilota reiterated her government's decision to remove Lambourne from his post and suspended him in May 2022. On 1 August 2022, Lambourne returned on a travel visa to visit his Kiribati family.

== 2022 Kiribati constitutional crisis ==
In May 2022, High Court Justice Lambourne was suspended over unspecified allegations of misconduct. In response, he filed a legal challenge, which was scheduled to be heard by Chief Justice Bill Hastings on 30 June 2022. However, instead of hearing the case, Hastings read out a letter from the Kiribati government stating that he too had been suspended with "immediate effect".

On 11 August 2022, the crisis intensified when the government attempted to deport Lambourne, despite an order from the Kiribati Court of Appeal that he should not be removed from the country. The government said that Lambourne had "breached the conditions of his visitor's visa and posed a security risk". The deportation led to a three-hour standoff between immigration officials and a Fiji Airways pilot who refused to board Lambourne against his will. Lambourne was then placed in detention without his passport, before being bailed out by another court of appeal decision. Lambourne called the actions "an unlawful order to remove me in defiance of the order of the court of appeal", adding that the deportation attempt was political.

On 12 August 2022, the court of appeal, in an urgent hearing, described the government's actions as "unacceptable and risks putting the Attorney-General and the persons directly concerned in contempt of court". A deputy solicitor general appeared in court on behalf of the attorney general, stating that Lambourne could not reside at his home because his wife is the leader of the opposition, and that there are supporters that visit their home, further implying "that once we put Mr Lambourne in the house, there would be something going [to] happen." The representative strongly denied that the government's action was political.

On 19 August 2022, the crisis further intensified, as the court of appeal was finally hearing the case again, despite the efforts of the government to postpone or cancel it, and the last-minute statement of the Office of the Beretitenti (OB), made just hours before the hearing, and after a US lawyer acting for the government "said the decision of the executive should be treated with 'maximum deference'". The court of appeal—justices Blanchard, Hansen, and Heath, all of whom are retired judges from New Zealand—reserved its decision and delivered a ruling on 26 August 2022, confirming the previous ruling of the chief justice.

Lambourne left Kiribati of his own volition before he was due to be deported in May 2024.
