= 2022 Kiribati constitutional crisis =

- Date: May 2022 — December 2022
- Cause: Suspension of High Court Judge David Lambourne, Chief Justice Bill Hastings and Court of Appeal Judges Sir Peter Blanchard, Rodney Hansen and Paul Heath.
- Participants: • Government of Kiribati • David Lambourne • Bill Hastings • Kiribati Court of Appeal
- Outcome: Failed deportation attempt of David Lambourne; Appointment of Attorney General Tetiro Semilota as Acting Chief Justice

A constitutional crisis began in Kiribati when the Cabinet of Kiribati suspended two of its High Court Justices. High Court Judge David Lambourne was suspended in May 2022 while Chief Justice Bill Hastings was suspended on 30 June 2022, both over allegations of misconduct. A Court of Appeal ruling upheld an earlier ruling of Chief Justice Hastings that the government acted unconstitutionally in not permitting David Lambourne to resume his duties as a High Court judge, and overturned the subsequent attempted deportation of Lambourne. In response, the government suspended all judges of the Kiribati Court of Appeal on 6 September 2022.

The government's actions prompted condemnations from legal agencies and law councils from Australia, New Zealand and the Commonwealth while two former Presidents of Kiribati called it unconstitutional. The government reiterated that its actions were constitutional citing Section 93 (4) of the constitution which provides check and balance for the government to prevent the judiciary from becoming too powerful. A motion of no confidence was raised by the opposition in September 2022 but was blocked by the government.

In October 2022, the President of Kiribati appointed Attorney General Tetiro Semilota as Acting Chief Justice, the first I-Kiribati and woman to be appointed to the position, albeit on an acting basis while Chief Justice Hastings remained suspended. Her appointment caused further controversy, the United Nations Special Rapporteur on the independence of judges and lawyers calling the appointment "concerning" and a conflict of interest. Nevertheless, the appointment was met with praise and congratulations from the President of Kiribati who appointed her, the country's law society and also from some of its citizens.

The constitutional crisis remains unresolved as at November 2023.

== Background ==
In February 2020, David Lambourne left Kiribati to attend a conference in Australia, however he was stranded due to the COVID-19 pandemic. The Kiribati government then attempted to prevent Lambourne from resuming his position in Tarawa by stopping his wages, by refusing to issue an ongoing work permit and by not allowing him to board several repatriation flights. On 11 November 2021, a court ruling by Chief Justice Bill Hastings overturned the government's actions, declaring them unconstitutional. In response, Attorney General Tetiro Semilota reiterated her government's decision to remove Lambourne from his post. On 1 August 2022, Lambourne returned on a travel visa to his Kiribati family and wife Tessie Eria Lambourne who is currently the leader of the opposition.

== Events ==
=== Suspension of all High Court judges and attempted deportation of David Lambourne ===
In May 2022, High Court Judge David Lambourne was suspended over allegations of misconduct. In response, he filed a legal challenge which was scheduled to be heard by Chief Justice Bill Hastings on 30 June 2022. However, instead of hearing the case, Hastings read out a letter from the Kiribati government stating that he too had been suspended with "immediate effect".

On 11 August 2022, the crisis intensified when the government attempted to deport Lambourne despite an order from the Kiribati Court of Appeal that he should not be removed from the country. The government said that Lambourne had "breached the conditions of his visitor's visa and posed a security risk". The deportation led to a three-hour stand-off between Immigration officials and a Fiji Airways pilot who refused to board Lambourne against his will.

He was then placed in detention without his passport before being bailed by another Court of Appeal decision. Lambourne called the actions "an unlawful order to remove me in defiance of the order of the court of appeal" adding that the deportation attempt was political.

On 12 August 2022, the Court of Appeal in an urgent court hearing described the government's actions as "unacceptable and risks putting the Attorney-General and the persons directly concerned in contempt of court." A Deputy Solicitor general appeared in court on behalf of the Attorney General stating that Lambourne "could not reside at his home because his wife Tessie Eria Lambourne is the leader of the opposition and that there are supporters that visits their home." He said "once we put Mr Lambourne in the house, there would be something going [to] happen." The representative strongly denied that the government's action was political.

=== Suspension of all judges of the Court of Appeal ===
On 19 August 2022, the crisis further intensified as the Court of Appeal heard the appeal from the Chief Justice's earlier judgment and Lambourne's challenge to his attempted deportation, despite the efforts of the government to postpone or cancel the hearing, and the last minute statement of the Office of the Beretitenti (OB), made just a few hours before the hearing, that the Court of Appeal must "correct itself." At the hearing, a US lawyer acting for the government said "the decision of the executive should be treated with “maximum deference”".

On 26 August 2022, the Court of Appeal unanimously upheld Chief Justice Hastings' decision in Republic v Lambourne. The Court of Appeal also confirmed that the government's order to deport Justice Lambourne was invalid and should be quashed.

On 6 September 2022, the New Zealand Ministry of Foreign Affairs and Trade in an email to Reuters announced that President Taneti Maamau had suspended all three New Zealand judges who sat on the Kiribati Court of Appeal and that they too were to be referred to a tribunal to investigate alleged misconduct.

=== Appointment of Attorney General Semilota as Acting Chief Justice ===
On 28 October 2022, the President of Kiribati appointed Attorney General Tetiro Semilota as the Acting Chief Justice making her the first I-Kiribati and also the first woman to be appointed to the position albeit on an acting basis while Chief Justice Hastings remained suspended. Prior to her appointment, the country had no women judges above the magistrate level.

==== Reactions to the appointment ====
The appointment raised concerns about the separation of powers in Kiribati. United Nations special rapporteur Diego García-Sayán said that her appointment will do little to address the backlog of cases caused by the crisis. He also added that she will have a conflict of interest given her position as Attorney General. The New Zealand Law Society said that the appointment challenged judicial independence and the separation of powers in Kiribati, adding that it made the Kiribati government the "judge in its own cause." Former President, Sir Ieremia Tabai, called the appointment a "questionable act" adding that the position of Chief Justice has been compromised by Semilota given her involvement as part of the government's attempts to dismiss foreign judges working in Kiribati.

On the other hand, President Taneti Maamau said he was proud and honored to have appointed the first I-Kiribati and woman to the position adding that his government is committed to upholding the rule of law and respect of the judiciary. The Kiribati Law Society added that the appointment will allow the country's court system to be back up and running. Some citizens of Kiribati offered their praise and congratulations to Acting Justice Semilota on Facebook.

== Reactions and responses ==
=== Domestic ===
Former President Anote Tong warned that the crisis has left the country with a "dysfunctional judiciary" and raises questions over its democratic system. He also added that "the deportation order by the president [Maamau] is really in direct contravention to the decision by the court. So, whether the government is now in contempt of court is the question that really needs to be addressed." Tong also points the fact that until Kiribati amends its laws and constitution "to recognise that the separation of powers is fundamental to its democratic system of government, everything else that has been done will become illegal."

First and former President Ieremia Tabai said that the government's actions has thrown the country into a crisis adding that he and other members of parliament will be raising a motion of no confidence against the government. Tabai also called on the Pacific Islands Forum to issue a statement condemning the government's actions. The motion of no confidence was blocked by government in September 2022 before the Parliament went into recess. Tabai said that the opposition will be countering the move by holding public meetings to make the people aware of the situation because the media are controlled by the government.

=== International ===
==== Legal agencies and councils ====
Three Commonwealth legal agencies including the Commonwealth Lawyers Association released a statement on 11 August 2022 urging "the government of Kiribati to adhere to the independence of the judiciary in line with the Constitution of Kiribati and international standards as expressed in the basic principles [...], the Latimer House Principles, and the Commonwealth Charter". The association and two others also "urge the Commonwealth Ministerial Action Group (CMAG) [...] to consider the actions of the Kiribati government as a matter of urgency". The legal agencies also spoke out earlier in June 2022 about the investigation of Lambourne by President Taneti Maamau.

The Law Council of Australia concern is heightened in the knowledge that warrants of appointment for the Court of Appeal expire on 15 August 2022, "and soon Kiribati will have neither a High Court nor Court of Appeal exercising jurisdiction". The New Zealand Law Society condemned the suspension of Chief Justice Bill Hastings and the three Court of Appeal judges adding that "the suspension of three senior judges - owing to disagreement with a ruling - is an inappropriate interference with the judicial process and undermines judicial independence in Kiribati."

==== Governments ====
A spokesperson from the New Zealand Ministry of Foreign Affairs and Trade said that "judicial independence is crucial for any healthy democracy. Aotearoa New Zealand continues to encourage the Government of Kiribati to ensure its decisions do not negatively impact the functioning of the judiciary." Foreign Affairs Minister Nanaia Mahuta is reported as saying "she expected Kiribati's reputation would be damaged due to the treatment of Justice Hastings."
