= Bill Hastings (judge) =

Canadian-born New Zealand judge (born 1957)

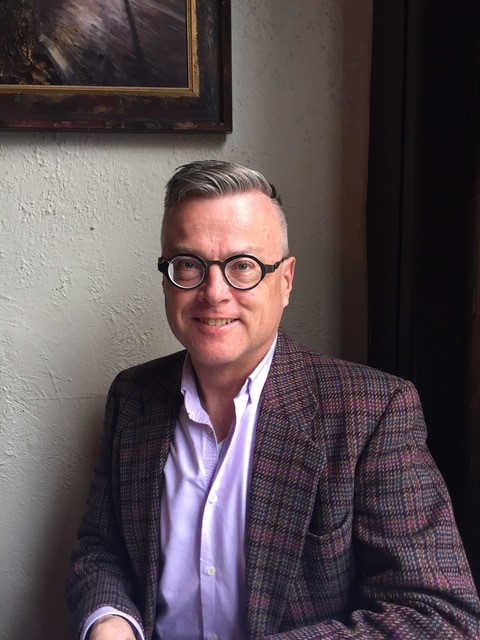

10th Chief Censor of New Zealand
- In office October 1999 – July 2010
- Preceded by: Kathryn Paterson
- Succeeded by: Andrew Jack

Chief Justice of Kiribati
- In office August 2021 – December 2022
- Preceded by: Sir John Muria
- Succeeded by: Tetiro Semilota

Personal details
- Born: William Kenneth Hastings; 1957 (age 68–69) Scarborough, Ontario, Canada
- Education: Lord Roberts Public School
- Alma mater: Midland Avenue Collegiate Institute

William Kenneth Hastings (born 1957) is a Canadian-born judge who served as the tenth Chief Censor of New Zealand from October 1999 to July 2010. He was the first Chair of the Immigration and Protection Tribunal from July 2010 until February 2013, and was the Chair of the Broadcasting Standards Authority from October 2018 until August 2021. He was sworn in as a Judge of the District Court of New Zealand on 9 July 2010, and as the tenth Judge of the Court Martial of New Zealand on 20 July 2021. On 9 August 2021, Hastings was sworn in as Chief Justice of the Republic of Kiribati, a position he held until 6 December 2022. He was also President of the Kiribati Court of Appeal. He was a member of the Supreme Court of Vanuatu as well as the Court of Appeal of Vanuatu from 1 July 2023 to 30 June 2024.

== Biography ==
Born in Scarborough, Ontario, Canada in 1957, he attended Lord Roberts Public School, and graduated from Midland Avenue Collegiate Institute. He holds a BA from the University of Trinity College, University of Toronto; law degrees from Osgoode Hall Law School, the London School of Economics, and Duke University; and was a practising barrister. He moved to New Zealand in 1985. Before becoming Chief Censor from 1999 to 2010, he was Deputy and Acting Chief Censor from December 1998 to October 1999. He was Senior Lecturer in Law (teaching Legal System and International Law), Deputy Dean of Law, a member of the governing Council at Victoria University of Wellington and is currently an Honorary Fellow in the Faculty of Law. He was also the Video Recordings Authority in 1994, a member of the Indecent Publications Tribunal from 1990 to 1994 and Deputy President of the Film and Literature Board of Review from 1995 to 1998. In 2010 he stood down as Chief Censor when he became a District Court Judge and Chair of the Immigration and Protection Tribunal. He was succeeded as Chief Censor by Andrew Jack, whose doctoral work he had supervised.

== Role as Chief Censor ==
In 1998, he was appointed Deputy Chief Censor at the Office of Film and Literature Classification by the Governor-General of New Zealand on the recommendation of the Jenny Shipley-led National coalition government. In 1999, he was appointed Chief Censor by the Governor-General on the recommendation of the Helen Clark-led Labour coalition government for a three-year term in 1999, a two-year term in 2002, another three-year term in 2004 and a third three-year term late in 2007.

In 2002, Hastings appeared in the public eye when he made censorship decisions on highly controversial films, particularly Baise-moi and Visitor Q, both of which were scheduled for screening at the Beck's Incredible Film Festival. In 2003, Hastings again appeared in the public eye when the computer game Manhunt was banned by his office, making its possession in New Zealand illegal. Following a meeting in Toronto on 22 December 2003 between Hastings and officials from the Ontario Ministry of Consumer and Business Services, Manhunt became the first computer game in Ontario to be classified as a film and restricted to adults in February 2004.

The Society for the Promotion of Community Standards in particular has accused Hastings of being a "gay activist" promoting homosexuality and promiscuity by giving too liberal classifications to films. This estimation is contradicted by examination of the appeals against classifications; the Film and Literature Board of Review found classifications too liberal in only 3.5% of cases under Hastings – in contrast to 27% under his predecessor, Kathryn Paterson – and has upheld 82% of OFLC decisions made under Hastings.

Apart from his professional role, some have taken issue with one aspect of his personal life in particular: Hastings is openly homosexual.

== Judicial career ==
On 21 June 2010, Hastings was appointed a District Court Judge and Chair of the Immigration and Protection Tribunal. Hastings was sworn in at Wellington on 9 July 2010. He was also the Chair of the Broadcasting Standards Authority from October 2018 until August 2021.

He is the first openly gay judge appointed in New Zealand.

In April 2013 he was succeeded as Chairperson of the Tribunal by Judge Carrie Wainwright and began sitting full-time as a District Court judge. From 2015 to 2021 he presided over the Special Circumstances Court in Wellington, a therapeutic court aiming to address the underlying causes of offending, an approach that underpins the Te Ao Mārama vision of the New Zealand District Court.

Judge Hastings was sworn in as a Judge of the Court Martial of New Zealand on 20 July 2021.

On 9 August 2021, Hastings was sworn in as Chief Justice of the Republic of Kiribati, succeeding his former student Sir John Muria. Chief Justice Hastings was seconded from the District Court of New Zealand for a period of three and a half years.

He is the first openly gay person to become the Chief Justice of any country.

On 11 November 2021, Chief Justice Hastings overturned the Kiribati government's attempt to retrospectively limit the term of another Kiribati High Court judge, Justice David Lambourne, declaring the Government's actions unconstitutional. On 30 June 2022, just as he was about to hear an appeal relating to further actions by the Kiribati government with respect to Justice Lambourne, he was abruptly suspended from his functions of Chief Justice by order of the President of Kiribati Taneti Maamau, which created a constitutional crisis. After the Court of Appeal upheld Chief Justice Hastings' judgment, all three of its members, Sir Peter Blanchard, Rodney Hansen and Paul Heath, were also suspended by President Maamau. Hastings resigned as Chief Justice of Kiribati on 6 December 2022.

On 3 July 2023, Hastings was sworn in as a Justice of the Supreme Court of Vanuatu for one year, and was a member of the Court of Appeal of Vanuatu. He returned to New Zealand as a Judge of the District Court and Court Martial at the end of June 2024. He was elected Vice President of the Judges' Association of New Zealand (JANZ) in 2025. He was also elected to the Council of the Commonwealth Magistrates’ and Judges’ Association (CMJA) for the Pacific Region in 2025.

== See also ==
- Censorship in New Zealand
