= Aiden O'Brien Quinn =

Irish judge (1932–2018)

Chief Justice of Botswana
- In office 1981–1987

Chief Justice of the Gilbert Islands
- In office 1977–1981

Chief Justice of the Seychelles
- In office 1976–1977

Personal details
- Born: 3 January 1932
- Died: 28 December 2018 (aged 86)
- Citizenship: Irish
- Occupation: lawyer and expatriate judge

James Aiden O'Brien Quinn, QC (3 January 1932 – 28 December 2018) was an Irish-born lawyer and expatriate judge. During his career, he served as a judge in Cameroon, the Seychelles, Kiribati, Solomon Islands, Botswana, and the United Kingdom.

== Biography ==
The son of William Patrick Quinn, Commissioner of the Garda Síochána and Helen Mary (née Walshe), O'Brien Quinn was educated at Presentation College, Bray, and University College, Dublin, where he took a BA and LLB (Hons). From 1949 to 1953, he worked for the National City Bank, Dublin.

Called to the Irish Bar in 1957, he practiced at the Bar under a Colonial Office Scheme from 1958 to 1960, when he became Crown Counsel and Acting Senior Crown Counsel in Nyasaland. In 1964, he became Assistant Attorney-General and Acting Attorney-General of West Cameroon, and in 1966 he became Procureur Général for West Cameroon and Avocat Général of the Federal Republic of Cameroon. From 1968 to 1972 he was Conseiller of the Cour Fédérale de Justice, Judge of the West Cameroon Supreme Court, Conseiller Technique (Harmonisation des Lois), at the Ministère de la Justice, Yaoundé, and Président of the Tribunal Administratif du Cameroun Occidental. In 1967, he was called to the English Bar by the Inner Temple.

From 1972 to 1976, O'Brien Quinn was Attorney-General of the Seychelles and of the British Indian Ocean Territory, becoming a Seychelles Queen's Counsel in 1973. He was also a member of the Legislative and Executive Councils, and of the Parliament of Seychelles, before and after independence. He was Acting Deputy Governor in 1975, a member of the official delegation on self-government in 1975, and on independence constitutions in 1976. From 1975 to 1976, he collaborated with Professor A. G. Chloros on the translation and updating of the Code Napoleon. He was Chief Justice of the Seychelles from 1976 to 1977, when he was expelled from the country during the 1977 Seychelles coup d'état.

After he was expelled from the Seychelles, O'Brien Quinn became Chief Justice of the Gilbert Islands (Kiribati from 1979), serving from 1977 to 1981, where he set up a new courts system. He was a member of the Council of State from 1979 to 1981. He was also a Judge of the High Court of Solomon Islands from 1977 to 1979. In 1981, he served as special prosecutor in the Falkland Islands.

O'Brien Quinn became Chief Justice of Botswana in 1981, retiring in 1987. After briefly working as an investment adviser, he was in England an Adjudicator of the Immigration Appeal Tribunal from 1990 to 1993, vice-president of the Immigration Appeal Tribunal from 1996 to 2004, and Member of the Special Immigration Appeals Commission from 1998 to 2002.

O'Brien Quinn was made a Chevalier of the Ordre de la Valeur of the Republic of Cameroon in 1967, and received the Kiribati Independence Medal in 1979.

== Personal life ==
Quinn married Christel Tyner in 1960; they had two sons and a daughter.
