= Judiciary of Kiribati =

The Judiciary of Kiribati is the branch of the Government of Kiribati which interprets and applies the laws of the country. In addition to the Constitution of Kiribati and the corpus of laws, the laws of Kiribati include customary law, which the courts must take into account when considering specified matters in criminal and civil proceedings.

== Courts ==
=== Magistrates' courts ===
Twenty-four magistrates' courts, composed of magistrates and a clerk, deal with less-serious civil, criminal, and land cases on a district basis. Magistrates courts are district courts of summary jurisdiction and were formally established by the Magistrates Courts Ordinance of 1977. They are by default composed of three magistrates appointed by the Minister of Justice on recommendation of the Chief Justice of the High Court, however, the Chief Justice may establish single magistrate units of which there are currently eleven operating on the islands of South Tarawa and Kiritimati.

=== High Court ===
The High Court hears more serious civil and criminal cases appealed to it by the magistrates' courts. It along with the Court of Appeal is constitutionally established as Kiribati's superior court of record. Appeals relating to land, divorce, and inheritance are dealt with by the High Court's Land Division. Prior to 2014 there was only the one High Court judge, but in that year a second puisne judge was appointed. The Chief Justice of Kiribati is the Head of the Judiciary in Kiribati and is appointed by the President of Kiribati on advice from the Cabinet in consultation with the Public Service Commission. Additional judges are appointed by the president on advice from the Chief Justice in consultation with the Public Service Commission. Only a person who has held office as a judge (in any country) or who has been qualified to practice law for at least five years are eligible to be appointed to the High Court.

=== Court of Appeal ===
The Kiribati Court of Appeal hears appeals from the High Court. The court is composed of the Chief Justice and other judges of the High Court, and other such justices appointed by the president on advice of the Chief Justice of the High Court sitting with the Public Service Commission. Judges appointed to the court in addition to the High Court judges may sit on the Court of Appeal for a specified term or for particular causes or matters. The president chooses which judge shall sit as President of the Court of Appeals. A Court of Appeal judge may not sit for an appeal for a case in which they gave a decision on any court on which they were a member.

Judges may only be removed if they are unable to carry out the functions of the office, or for "misbehavior" as decided by the president on resolution by the Maneaba ni Maungatabu after advice from a tribunal appointed by the president, one of whose members must be a person who has held "high judicial office".

== Chief Justices ==
From 1877 to 1962, the Chief Justice of Fiji was ex officio the Chief Judicial Commissioner for the Western Pacific including the Gilbert Islands (as Gilbert and Ellice Islands colony).

#	Incumbent	Portrait	Tenure		Head of State	Notes		
#	Incumbent	Portrait	Took office	Left office	Head of State	Notes		
Chief Judicial Commissioner for the Western Pacific and Chief Justice of Fiji (1877–1962)
1.	Sir John Gorrie		1877	1882	Victoria			
	Sir Fielding Clarke; Acting		1882	1882	Victoria			
2.	Sir Henry Wrenfordsley		1882	1885	Victoria			
	Sir Fielding Clarke; Acting for Wrenfordsley		1884	1885	Victoria			
3.	Sir Fielding Clarke		1885	1889	Victoria			
4.	Sir Henry Berkeley		1889	1902	Victoria; Edward VII			
5.	Sir Charles Major		1902	1914	Edward VII; George V			
	Albert Ehrhardt Acting for Major		1910	21 February 1911	Edward VII; George V	Ehrhardt, the then Attorney-General of Fiji, acted as Chief Judicial Commissioner while Major, the incumbent Chief Judicial Commissioner, was acting as High Commissioner for the Western Pacific.		
6.	Sir Charles Davson		1914	1922	George V			
	Sir Kenneth Muir MacKenzie; Acting		1922	1923	George V			
7.	Sir Alfred Young, KC		1923	1929	George V			
8.	Sir Maxwell Anderson, CBE, KC, RN (retd.)		1929	1936	George V Edward VIII			
9.	Sir Owen Corrie, MC		1936	1945	Edward VIII; George VI			
10.	Sir Claud Seton, MC		1945	22 November 1949	George V			
11.	Sir James Thomson		1949	1953	George VI; Elizabeth II			
12.	Sir Ragnar Hyne		1953	1958	Elizabeth II			
13.	Sir Albert Lowe		1958	1962	Elizabeth II			
Chief Justice of the High Court of the Western Pacific (1962–1976)
14.	Sir Geoffrey Briggs		1962	1965	Elizabeth II 15.	Sir Jocelyn Bodilly	1965	1976

=== Gilbert Islands (from 1978) ===
Name	Took office	Left office	Notes
James Aiden O'Brien Quinn	1977	1979	

=== Kiribati (from 1979) ===
Name	Took office	Left office	Notes
James Aiden O'Brien Quinn	1979	1981	
Jeffrey R. Jones	1981	1985	
Vincent Oluoma Maxwell	1985	1990	
Faqir Muhammad	1990	1995	
Stanley Cory	1995	1995	Acting
Richard Lussick	1995	2000	
Robin Rhodes Millhouse	2000	2011	Also Chief Justice of Nauru 2006–2010
Sir John Baptist Muria	2011	2020	
Bill Hastings	2021	Incumbent	Suspended since 30 June 2022 (see 2022 Kiribati constitutional crisis)
Tetiro Semilota	2022		Acting

== Sources ==
- "Annual Address, 2015". Chief Justice's Chambers, Kiribati.
- Brereton, Bridget (1997). Law, Justice and Empire: The Colonial Career of John Gorrie 1829-1892. University of the West Indies Press. ISBN 9789766400354.
- Daley, Kevin (1996). Communalism and the challenge of Fijian unity (PDF) (PhD thesis). University of Hawaii.
- Lavaka, Penny (Spring 1981). "The Tonga Ma'a Tonga Kautaha: a watershed in British-Tongan relations". Pacific Studies. 4 (2). Institute for Polynesian Studies. Archived from the original on 4 March 2016.
