= Normando Álvarez García =

Argentine politician and lawyer

Normando Miguel Álvarez García

Argentine ambassador to Bolivia
- In office 11 January 2016 – 10 December 2019
- President: Mauricio Macri
- Preceded by: Ariel Basteiro
- Succeeded by: Ariel Basteiro

Minister of Labor of Jujuy Province
- Incumbent
- Assumed office 10 December 2019
- Governor: Gerardo Morales

Personal details
- Born: 13 September 1952 (age 72); San Salvador de Jujuy, Argentina
- Political party: Radical Civic Union
- Education: National University of Lomas de Zamora

Normando Miguel Álvarez García (born 13 September 1952) is an Argentine politician and lawyer. He served as the Argentine ambassador to Bolivia between 2016 and 2019, during the presidency of Mauricio Macri. As of 2021, he serves as minister of work in Jujuy Province, under the governorship of Gerardo Morales.

== Biography ==
Álvarez García began his political career when he was elected councilor for San Salvador de Jujuy between 1985 and 1989; he later ascended to the provincial legislature when he was elected between 1989 and 1991, that last year he was a national deputy for his province, until 1999. He graduated as a lawyer in 2003 from the National University of Lomas de Zamora.

After passing through the Congress, he did not hold any political office again, dedicating himself to the practice of law and political advisory activities as well as business, until the inauguration of Mauricio Macri as president in 2015. He was appointed as ambassador to Bolivia.

== 2019 Bolivian political crisis ==
When he served as ambassador in that country, the Bolivian political crisis occurred in 2019 when president Evo Morales resigned amid increasing protests against his reelection for a fourth term. The government of Macri immediately recognized Jeanine Áñez as president and refused to label the removal of Morales as a coup. In July 2021, the Bolivian government denounced that a commander of the Bolivian Air Force had thanked Álvarez García for the Argentine government involvement in the removal, by sending shotguns and tear gas amid the political and social crisis.

On 17 July 2021, he was formally accused in Argentina for his involvement in the case known as the "coup d'état" case in Bolivia.

== Minister of Labor in Jujuy ==
On 15 July 2021, Governor Gerardo Morales publicly defended Álvarez García from the accusations by the current Argentine government and the government of Luis Arce in Bolivia. Morales awarded Álvarez García the Order Juan Manuel Belgrano and said that the provincial government would not allow the "lie to take place" and reassured Álvarez García in his position.
