= Dance in Kiribati =

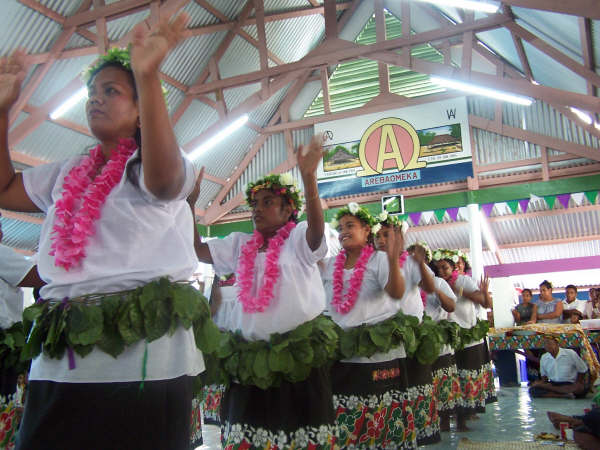
Women of Kiribati performing traditional dance at Bonriki International Airport

Dance in Kiribati includes various styles unique to the island nation. The uniqueness of Kiribati dance when compared with other forms of Pacific Islands dance is its emphasis on the outstretched arms of the dancer and the sudden birdlike movement of the head. The Frigate bird (Fregata minor) on the Kiribati flag refers to this bird-like style of Kiribati dancing. Most dances are in the standing or sitting position with movement limited and staggered.

In 1963 Gerd Koch filmed on Tabiteuea traditional dances and songs of the ruoia series: the kawawa, the introductory song and dance; the kamei with a dance leader, the wan tarawa and the kabuakaka; and a bino song and dance complete with accompanying arm movements. Koch also filmed the song and dance of the kamei style from the ruoia dance series on Onotoa and the standing dance of the batere style that was accompanied by a choir of men and women and by drum beats. On Nonouti Koch filmed the stick dance of the tirere style.

== Styles ==
Kiribati dancing can be categorized into eight main styles. Each incorporating the bird-like movements but differences lie in costume, the gender of the dancer, the number of dancers, accompanying music, and the position and movement of the dancer or dancers.

=== Ruoia ===
One of the oldest forms is called the Ruoia. The style requires the dancer or dancers to move in time with a chorus of singers standing behind. Te Ruoia usually has three verses each sung with increasing tempo. Within the rouia there are three subtle forms; te kemai (usually performed by men), te kabuti (performed only by women) and the third is unique to Abemama atoll where it is greatly stylised. This is called te wa ni banga. The musical origin of this form of dance is not clear.

=== Kaimatoa ===
The most widely practised dance in contemporary Kiribati is the Kaimatoa, literally meaning the dance of strength. The dance tests the dancer's physical endurance to outstretch their arms for long periods but it also tests the dancer's emotional endurance. The music and rhythm is often very emotive and it is not uncommon to see dancers weep throughout the dance. The kaimatoa can be performed by both men, women and children.

=== Buki ===
Another form which is relatively modern within the history of Kiribati dance is the Buki. The buki originated in the northern islands of the Gilbert group (Butaritari and Makin). However, it is widely danced in all islands. The dance is only performed by women and requires the dancer to wear a very thick and heavy coconut frond skirt made of boiled and softened newly sprouted pinneals of the coconut leaf (te kakoko). The skirt can weigh up to ten kilograms (22 pounds) and generally shin length. As in the other forms of Pacific dance such as the Tahitian hura the buki emphasizes the movement of the hips. Generally the dancer is required to show effortlessness as if the torso and hips are disconnected. Hence, the torso and shoulders are to be kept as still as possible and the movement of the hips graceful and resembling the movement of water.

=== Tirere ===
The only dance using a type of percussion instrument is the tirere (pronounced seerere). The tirere is usually performed by a group of ten to twenty paired dancers. Each dancer has a foot long stick which are struck in time with the accompanying song to create a rhythm. The tirere is rarely performed in contemporary Kiribati.

=== Te Rebwe/Te Kabuti ===
This form of dance works on the basis of beat and timing. The emphasis of te rebwe involves clapping and step footing with or without musical instrument. A stylised form of this dance is recently recalled te taubati. However, the original form of te rebwe had deviated into emphasizing war and fighting movements and became known as te kabuti. This should not be confused with the original te kabuti which is performed by women. This is a war dance and is often performed to peacefully demonstrate traditional martial arts styles skier

== Vulgarity of smiling ==
Smiling whilst dancing as seen in the modern Hawaiian Hula is generally considered vulgar within the context of Kiribati dancing. This is because by tradition, Kiribati dance was not only a form of entertainment but also as tributes to particular spirits, the unification of two clans (kainga), a form of oral storytelling and simply the display of the skill, beauty and endurance of the dancer.
