= John Muria =

Solomon Islands judge

Sir Sir Gilbert John Baptist Muria

Chief Justice of Solomon Islands
- In office 1992–2003

Judge of the High Court of Sierra Leone
- In office 2003–2006

Justice of the Court of Appeal of Sierra Leone
- In office 2003–2006

Justice of the Supreme Court of Sierra Leone
- In office 2003–2006

Justice of the Supreme Court of Belize
- In office 2007–2010

Chief Justice of the High Court of Kiribati
- In office 2011–2020

Judge of the High Court of Tuvalu
- Incumbent
- Assumed office 2021

Personal details
- Born: 1953 (age 72–73)
- Occupation: Judge

Sir Gilbert John Baptist Muria is a Solomon Islands judge and was the first indigenous Solomon Islander to be Chief Justice of Solomon Islands.

Muria was born in 1953. He was Chief Justice of Solomon islands from 1992 to 2003. He then sat as a judge on the courts of Sierra Leone from 2003 to 2006, sitting on each of the High Court of Sierra Leone, the Court of Appeal of Sierra Leone, and the Supreme Court of Sierra Leone. In 2007, the Commonwealth Secretariat facilitated Muria becoming a justice of the Supreme Court of Belize, where he remained until 2010. Muria was Chief Justice of the High Court of Kiribati from 2011 to 2020.

Muria was appointed as the Chancellor of the Solomon Islands National University, which was officially launched on 18 April 2013.

In 2021, Muria was appointed as a judge of the High Court of Tuvalu.
