= Tetiro Semilota =

I-Kiribati jurist

Tetiro Semilota Maate Moaniba is an I-Kiribati jurist who has been serving as acting Chief Justice of Kiribati since 2022 and was involved in the 2022 constitutional crisis. She previously served as Attorney General of Kiribati between 2016 and 2022, being the first woman to hold both positions.

== Career ==
Semilota served as the Commissioner of the High Court of Kiribati and Chief Registrar from 2008 to 2016.

Semilota was appointed by president Taneti Maamau as the first woman to serve as Attorney General of Kiribati on 30 September 2016. In this role, she became the government’s chief legal officer. In December 2021, Semilota was found guilty by a court after ordering a government official to disregard a High Court order.

Following the suspension of the Chief Justice Bill Hastings, on 28 October 2022 president Maamau appointed Semilota as the acting Chief Justice, making her the first I-Kiribati and also the first woman to be appointed to the position. She was sworn in front of Maamu in a private ceremony. Her appointment was viewed by legal experts as an erosion of judicial independence and a cause for concern regarding the decline of democracy, given that she played a role in the wave of suspensions of high-ranking judges that led to the constitutional crisis in summer 2022.
