= Islam in Kiribati =

Islam in Kiribati (Arabic:الإسلام في كيريباتي) is a minority religion in the country.According to the official census in 2010, the number of Muslims was 139 out of 103,058 residents, or 0.12% of the total population. Most of the Muslim community is concentrated in the capital, Tarawa.

== History ==
Compared to other nations in the Pacific region, Islam's history in Kiribati is relatively recent. During the colonial era under the British, there was no significant migration from British colonies in Africa or India to Kiribati. The presence of Islam in Kiribati began only in the late 20th century. In 1989, Ghanaian Muslim missionary Hafiz Jibril Ahmad Saeed was sent to the southern Pacific. By 1991, he arrived in Kiribati and established the first (Ahmadiyya) Muslim community in the country. The 2005 census did not report any data on Muslims, but religious organizations estimate around 140 Muslims in the country, constituting 0.01% of the population. In October 2016, U.S. politician Bob Riley visited Kiribati and engaged with Muslim community leaders to discuss challenges faced by religious minorities.

== Current status ==
Kiribati's Constitution (Article 11) guarantees freedom of conscience and religion. The Ahmadiyya Muslim community remains the largest Islamic group in Kiribati. According to Imam Fahat, the community leader, minor disputes between Muslims and Christians have occurred but were resolved through dialogue, and relations between faiths are now peaceful.

The capital, South Tarawa, has a small mosque serving as the Ahmadiyya community's religious center, where Friday prayers and gatherings are held. Kiribati's laws also permit Muslims to pray at home.
