= List of mammals of Kiribati =

This is a list of the mammal species recorded in Kiribati, a sovereign state in the central Pacific Ocean. There are thirteen mammal species around Kiribati, all of which are marine mammals in the order Cetacea. None are thought to be at risk, but some have insufficient data collected on them to allow an assessment to be made.

The marine mammals of the order Cetacea that have been identified in the Pacific is described in the literature review by Miller (2006) and by the Secretariat of the Pacific Regional Environment Programme (SPREP). A revision of the list of cetaceans reported in the ocean surrounding the islands of Kiribati was carried by Miller (2009).

In 2010 a research voyage was conducted within the exclusive economic zones (EEZ) of Kiribati and Tuvalu. The survey confirmed the presence of seven species of cetaceans: Bryde's, sperm, killer, shortfinned pilot and false killer whales and spinner and striped dolphins.

The following tags are used to highlight each species' conservation status as assessed by the International Union for Conservation of Nature:

DD	Data deficient	There is inadequate information to make an assessment of the risks to this species.

== Order: Cetacea (whales) ==
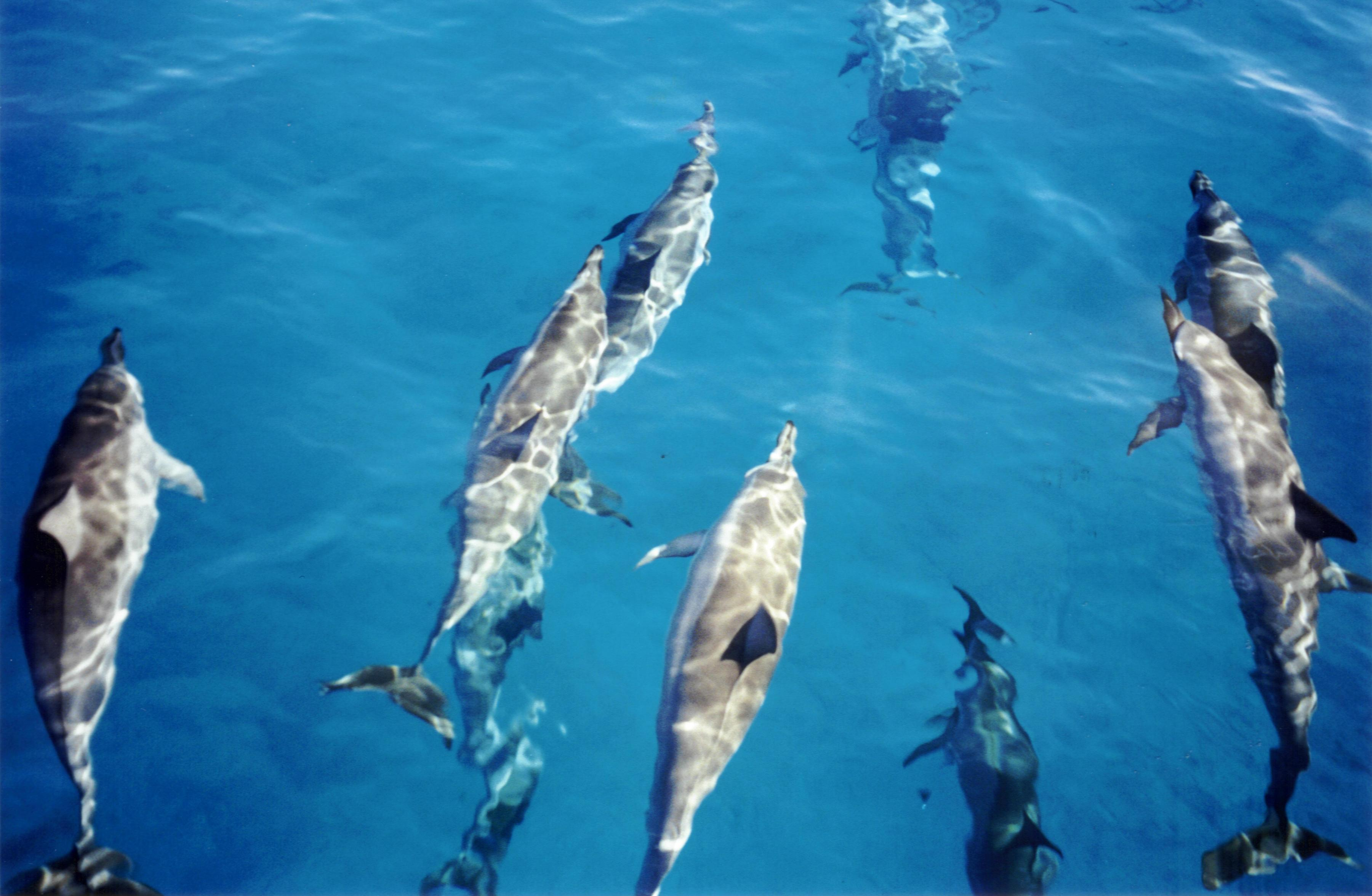
Spinner dolphin

The order Cetacea includes whales, dolphins and porpoises. They are the mammals most fully adapted to aquatic life with a spindle-shaped nearly hairless body, protected by a thick layer of blubber, and forelimbs and tail modified to provide propulsion underwater.

Lack of studies and dedicated observation efforts result in poor understanding of cetacean diversity in the region.

- Suborder: Mysticeti
  - Family: Balaenidae
    - Genus: Eubalaena
      - Southern right whale, Eubalaena australis LR/cd
- Suborder: Odontoceti
  - Family: Physeteridae
    - Genus: Physeter
      - Sperm whale, Physeter macrocephalus VU
  - Superfamily: Platanistoidea
    - Family: Kogiidae
      - Genus: Kogia
        - Dwarf sperm whale, Kogia sima LR/lc
    - Family: Ziphidae
      - Subfamily: Hyperoodontinae
        - Genus: Hyperoodon
          - Southern bottlenose whale, Hyperoodon planifrons LR/cd
        - Genus: Mesoplodon
          - Blainville's beaked whale, Mesoplodon densirostris DD
          - Ginkgo-toothed beaked whale, Mesoplodon ginkgodens DD
          - Deraniyagala's beaked whale, Mesoplodon hotaula DD
    - Family: Delphinidae (marine dolphins)
      - Genus: Steno
        - Rough-toothed dolphin, Steno bredanensis DD
      - Genus: Stenella
        - Spinner dolphin, Stenella longirostris LR/cd
      - Genus: Lagenodelphis
        - Fraser's dolphin, Lagenodelphis hosei DD
      - Genus: Globicephala
        - Short-finned pilot whale, Globicephala macrorhynchus LR/cd
      - Genus: Feresa
        - Pygmy killer whale, Feresa attenuata DD
      - Genus: Orcinus
        - Orca, Orcinus orca LR/cd

== See also ==
- List of chordate orders
- Lists of mammals by region
- List of prehistoric mammals
- Mammal classification
- List of mammals described in the 2000s
- Pacific Islands Cetaceans Memorandum of Understanding
