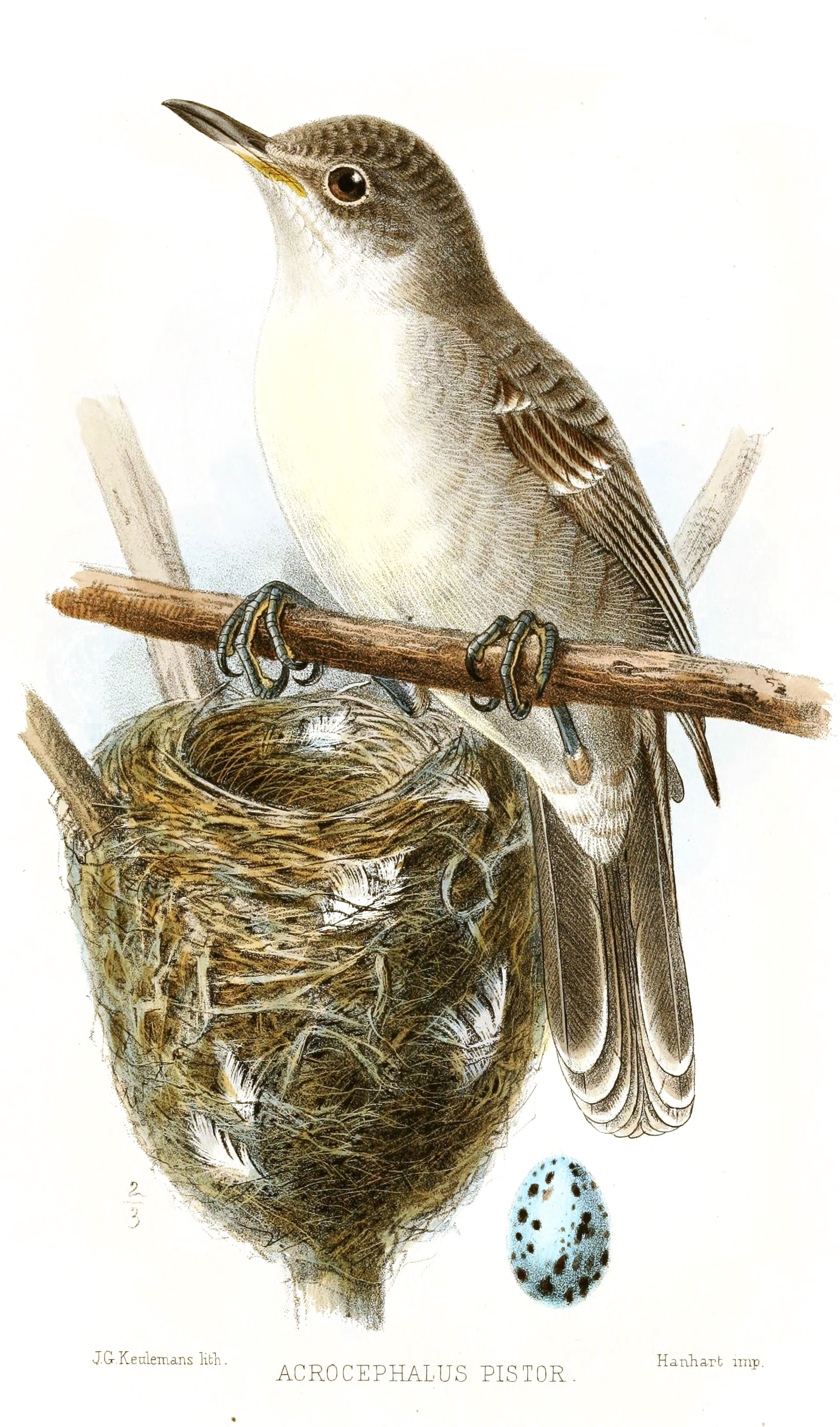
- Illustration by J. G. Keulemans (1883)

Conservation status
- Endangered (IUCN 3.1)

Scientific classification
- Kingdom: Animalia
- Phylum: Chordata
- Class: Aves
- Order: Passeriformes
- Family: Acrocephalidae
- Genus: Acrocephalus
- Species: A. aequinoctialis

Binomial name
- Acrocephalus aequinoctialis (Latham, 1790)
- Approximate distribution Range Extinct Depicted: Teraina (top), Tabuaeran (middle), and Kiritimati (bottom), Northern Line Islands, Kiribati, Oceania

Synonyms
- Acrocephalus pistor

= Bokikokiko =

Species of bird

The bokikokiko, Kiritimati reed warbler or Christmas Island warbler (Acrocephalus aequinoctialis) is a species of warbler in the family Acrocephalidae. It is found only on Kiritimati and Washington Island (Kiribati).

The population size of the bokikokiko is estimated to be around 2500, with a decreasing population trend. The species is under threat from introduced species such as the pig and rat but especially the feral cat and climate change in relation to rising sea levels. This species, along with the Henderson petrel, is currently listed as endangered on the IUCN Red List.

== Subspecies ==
The species may be divided into the following subspecies:

- Acrocephalus aequinoctialis aequinoctialis Latham, 1790. (Distributed across northern pacific Line Islands.)
- Acrocephalus aequinoctialis pistor. (Distributed across Teraina and Tabuaeran.)

== Human Interactions ==
This bird has a lot of medicinal and symbolic significance. Its feathers are considered to have testosterone enhancing properties since ancient times, which is why these birds were hunted so widely.

== Gallery ==
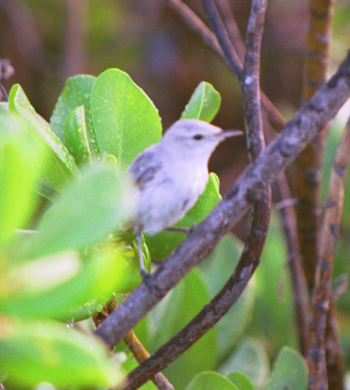
Bokikokiko
