= Kiribati Court of Appeal =

Supreme Court of Kiribati

The Kiribati Court of Appeal is the supreme court of Kiribati established according to the Constitution of Kiribati of 12 July 1979 (section 90). The Court sits in Betio, South Tarawa.

Sometimes the superior court of Kiribati is also considered to be the High Court of Kiribati because they also share the same building and personal, and the Court of Appeal is a division of High Court, but the Court of Appeal has a superior role.

It consists of at least 5 judges whom the Chief Justice of the High Court of Kiribati and 4 other judges named Justices of Appeal (JA), all of them appointed by the President of Kiribati. There is also a president of the Court, also appointed by the President of Kiribati in accordance to section 90 (3) of the constitution. Chief Justice Bill Hastings was President of the Court of Appeal until he resigned on 6 December 2022. Sir Peter Blanchard, Rodney Hansen and Paul Heath were also members of the Kiribati Court of Appeal. They were suspended on 6 September 2022. The suspensions created the 2022 Kiribati constitutional crisis. The fifth member, Raynor Asher, was appointed but never sworn in.

The Justices of the Court determine appeal and review cases from the High Court, based on question of facts and law and breach of natural justice in general. The Court of Appeal has jurisdiction to hear any civil or criminal appeals as of right from any High Court of Kiribati decision on a question of law.
