= Constitution of Kiribati =

The Constitution of Kiribati is the supreme law of Kiribati, which was implemented in 1979. The constitution was subsequently amended in the years 1995, 2016, and 2018. The constitution established the principles of the Bill of Rights and the protection of the Fundamental Rights and Freedoms of the individual.

== History ==
In 1977, John Hilary Smith, British Governor of the Gilbert Islands, reunited a Constitutional Convention of 150 members.

Kiribati's independence was granted by the United Kingdom as a result of the Kiribati Independence Order 1979 (UK). The Republic of Kiribati became an independent constitutional republic as a sovereign and democratic state, and the 41st member of the Commonwealth of Nations on 12 July 1979. The country's independence led to the creation of the Constitution of Kiribati, and several other minor law documents the same year.

== Structure ==
The Constitution is divided into 10 chapters and 2 schedules.
