= List of members of Gray's Inn =

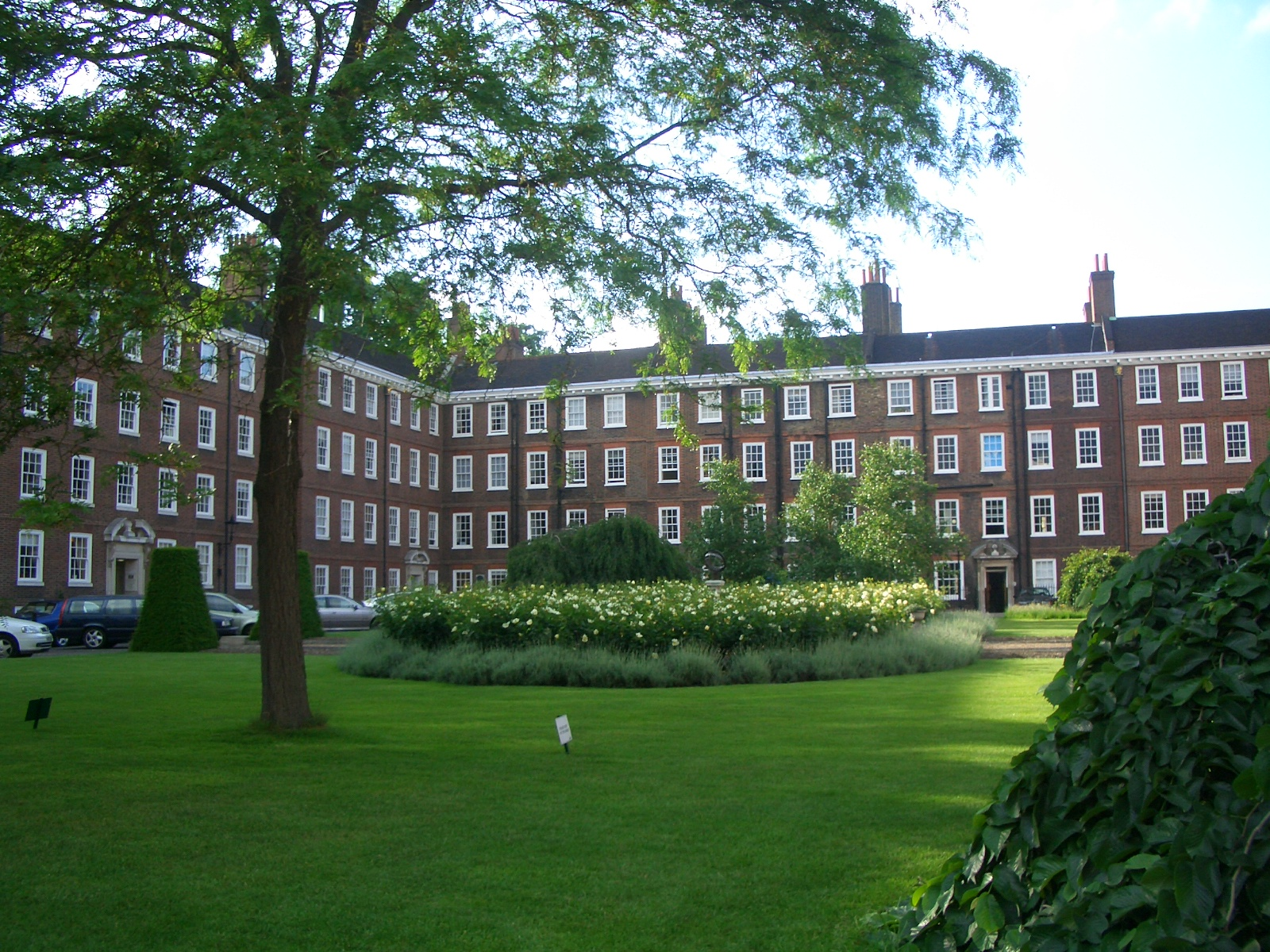
Part of Gray's Inn Square

The Honourable Society of Gray's Inn, commonly known simply as Gray's Inn, is one of the four Inns of Court in London. To be called to the Bar and practise as a barrister in England and Wales, an individual must belong to one of these Inns. The Inn has existed for over 600 years. Its members have included many noted lawyers and judges, such as Francis Bacon, Lord Slynn, Lord Bingham of Cornhill, Lord Hoffmann, Lord Pannick and others. Outside the Bar and judiciary of England and Wales, members have included the clergy (including five Archbishops of Canterbury), the industrialist John Wynne, the astronomer John Lee, media figures, such as Huw Thomas, and members of the Bar and judiciary of other nations, such as Yang Ti-liang (former Chief Justice of the Supreme Court of Hong Kong) and Aitzaz Ahsan (former president of the Supreme Court Bar Association of Pakistan). As well as full members, the Inn also offers honorary membership to particularly distinguished members of society. During the Second World War, for example, both Franklin D. Roosevelt and Winston Churchill became honorary Benchers, and therefore members. Other than honorary members, this list only contains those individuals who were called to the Bar, not those who simply joined but left before qualifying.

== Lawyers ==
Call	Name	Noted for	Notes
1540	Nicholas Barham	Serjeant-at-Law who investigated and prosecuted the Ridolfi plot	
1583	Thomas Ashe	legal writer and qualified barrister, although he never practised the law	
1585	Henry Finch	legal writer	
1674	William Atwood	Lawyer and writer	
1792	John Bell	Considered the best equity barrister of his age, even though he could "neither read, write, walk, nor talk"	
1918	Dhirendra Mohan Dhar	Indian barrister, lawyer practiced at High Court of Calcutta.	
1922	B. R. Ambedkar	Indian polymath, jurist, economist, politician and social reformer and the father of the Indian Constitution	
1937	Jack Hamson	legal writer and jurist of comparative and common law, President of the International Academy of Comparative Law	
1940	V.T. Thomas	Indian advocate, jurist and philanthropist.	
1959	Christopher Bathurst	English barrister with a successful practice who became a Queen's Counsel in 1978 before inheriting a hereditary peerage and joining the House of Lords	
1961	Samuel Eson Johnson Ecoma	former Chief Judge of Cross River State, Nigeria.	
1967	Aitzaz Ahsan	Pakistani advocate, President of the Supreme Court Bar Association of Pakistan	
1967	Michael Mansfield	King's Counsel and head of chambers at Nexus Chambers	
1977	Francis Chang-Sam	Seychelles advocate, former Registrar General of Seychelles and Attorney-General of Seychelles. He also headed the secretariat of the Constitution of the Third Republic of Seychelles.	
1980	Noor Dean	Fiji Indian lawyer and politician	
1988	Roger Tan Kor Mee	Malaysian advocate & solicitor, former member of the Malaysian Bar Council and now a Water Commissioner of Malaysia.	

== Judiciary ==
Call	Name	Noted for	Notes
1342	William Skipwith	Chief Baron of the Exchequer	
1374	William Gascoigne	Chief Justice of the King's Bench	
1420	William Yelverton	Justice of the Court of King's Bench	
1430	Thomas Billing	Chief Justice of the King's Bench	
1438	John Markham	Chief Justice of the King's Bench	
1448	Thomas Bryan	Chief Justice of the Common Pleas	
1455	William Hussey	Chief Justice of the King's Bench	
1461	John Fineux	Chief Justice of the King's Bench	
1535	John Birch	Baron of the Exchequer	
1581	James Altham	Baron of the Exchequer	
1611	Timothy Turner	Chief Justice of Chester	
1614	John Bankes	Chief Justice of the Common Pleas and of the King's Bench	
1616	Thomas Bedingfield	Justice of the Court of Common Pleas	
1625	Thomas Widdrington	Chief Baron of the Exchequer	
1627	John Bradshaw	President of the High Court of Justice for the trial of King Charles I and first Lord President of the Council of State	
1627	John Archer	Justice of the Court of Common Pleas	
1657	John Powell	Justice of the Court of Common Pleas and the Court of King's Bench	
1651	Robert Baldock	Justice of the Court of King's Bench	
1663	John Holt	Lord Chief Justice	
1670	Richard Allibone	Justice of the Court of King's Bench	
1676	Thomas Bury	Chief Baron of the Exchequer	
1729	Thomas Clarke	Master of the Rolls	
1792	John Bayley	Justice of the Court of King's Bench and Baron of the Exhequer	
1827	James Bacon	Vice Chancellor in Bankruptcy and later, by custom, Judge of the High Court of Justice	
1879	John Romilly	Master of the Rolls	
1879	John Ross	Lord Chancellor of Ireland	
1891	James Atkin	Law Lord	
1904	Maas Thajoon Akbar	Justice of the Supreme Court of Sri Lanka, Solicitor General of Sri Lanka	
1904	Augustus Uthwatt	Lord Justice of Appeal	
1907	Malcolm Hilbery	Judge of the King's Bench Division of the High Court of Justice	
1919	Gilbert Walter King	Judge of the British Supreme Court for China	
1928	Humphrey Waldock	Justice of the International Court of Justice	
1937	Colin Sleeman	Assistant Judge Advocate General and circuit judge	
1946	Elwyn Jones	Lord Chancellor	
1946	John Vinelott	High Court Judge Chancery Division	
1954	Yang Ti-liang	former Chief Justice of the Supreme Court of Hong Kong	
1956	John Geoffrey Jones	former president of the Mental Health Review Tribunal for England and Wales	
1959	Gordon Slynn	Lord of Appeal in Ordinary	
1959	Robin Auld	Lord Justice of Appeal	
1960	Anthony Campbell	Lord Justice of Appeal in Northern Ireland	
1961	Mark Potter	President of the Family Division	
1966	Richard Banda	Chief Justice of the Malawi High Court, Chief Justice of the Swaziland High Court	
1967	Robin Jacob	Lord Justice of Appeal	
1969	Brenda Hale	President of the Supreme Court of the United Kingdom	
1970	Michael Hart	Judge of the Chancery Division	
1972	Falak Sher	Chief Justice of the Lahore High Court, Justice of the Supreme Court of Pakistan	
1973	Dame Joan Sawyer	First female Chief Justice of The Bahamas Supreme Court and then first female President of the Court of Appeal of The Bahamas (retired 2010)	
1974	John Sheil	Lord Justice of Appeal in Northern Ireland	

== Politicians ==
Call	Name	Noted for	Notes
1355	Robert Ashton	Lord Chancellor of Ireland, Lord High Treasurer	
1515	Robert Aske	Politician and rebel who led the Pilgrimage of Grace	
1524	Thomas Cromwell	Chief minister to King Henry VIII of England from 1532 to 1540	
1533	Nicholas Bacon	Lord Keeper of the Great Seal	
1552	Christopher Yelverton	Speaker of the House of Commons	
1554	Thomas Snagge	Speaker of the British House of Commons and Attorney-General for Ireland	
1560	John Brograve	Member of Parliament for Preston, Attorney General of the Duchy of Lancaster	
1565	Edward Bacon	Member of Parliament for Great Yarmouth and Tavistock	
1582	Francis Bacon	Politician and statesman who served as Lord Chancellor and Attorney General	
1617	Nathaniel Bacon	Member of Parliament for Ipswich	
1631	John Cooke	Solicitor General	
1644	Levinus Bennet	Member of Parliament for Cambridgeshire	
1648	William Brodrick	Member of the Sealed Knot, Surveyor General of Ireland, Member of Parliament for Dungarvan in the Irish House of Commons	
1658	William Williams	Solicitor General and Speaker of the House of Commons	
1673	Thomas Allen	Lord Mayor of the City of London	
1682	Alexander Pendarves	Member of Parliament for Penryn, Saltash, Helston, and Launceston	
1718	Hugh Williams	Member of Parliament for Anglesey	
1839	George Hammond Whalley	Member of Parliament for Peterborough	
1871	William Bowen Rowlands	Member of Parliament for Ceredigion	
1885	Sidney Webb	Member of Parliament for Seaham, President of the Board of Trade, Secretary of State for Dominion Affairs, Secretary of State for the Colonies, Co-founder London School of Economics	
1894	F.E. Smith	Lord Chancellor, Secretary of State for India	
1910	Khabeeruddin Ahmed	Member Bengal Legislative Council	
1922	David Maxwell Fyfe	Solicitor General, Attorney General, Lord Chancellor and Home Secretary	
1922	Hartley Shawcross	Attorney General	
1923	Grantley Herbert Adams	Premier of Barbados	
1924	Ba Maw	Prime Minister of Burma	
1933	Leslie Goonewardene	Sri Lankan independence activist and founder of the nation's first political party, the Lanka Sama Samaja Party. Also served in cabinet post.	
1935	Elwyn Jones	Attorney General, Lord Chancellor	
1944	Emrys Roberts	Member of Parliament for Merioneth	
1948	Noor Hassanali	The first Indo-Trinidadian to hold the office of President of Trinidad and Tobago and was the first Muslim Head of State in the Americas	
1950	Glafcos Clerides	Fourth President of the Republic of Cyprus	
1954	Spyros Kyprianou	Second President of the Republic of Cyprus	
1954	Tassos Papadopoulos	Fifth President of the Republic of Cyprus	
1959	John "Tom" Adams	Premier of Barbados	
1959	Lalith Athulathmudali	Sri Lankan Member of Parliament and Minister of Education	
1974	Roy Roebuck	Member of Parliament	
1975	Vera Baird	Solicitor General for England and Wales	
?	Stuart Young	Prime Minister-designate of Trinidad and Tobago	

== Clergy ==
Call	Name	Noted for	Notes
1520	William Atwater	Bishop of Lincoln	
1555	Stephen Gardiner	Bishop of Winchester	
1588	Richard Bancroft	Archbishop of Canterbury	
1589	Lancelot Andrewes	Bishop of Winchester	
1592	John Whitgift	Archbishop of Canterbury	
1615	William Laud	Archbishop of Canterbury	
1615	Joseph Hall	Bishop of Exeter	
1622	Thomas Morton	Bishop of Lichfield	
1623	James Ussher	Archbishop of Armagh and Primate of All Ireland	
1635	William Juxon	Archbishop of Canterbury	
1663	Gilbert Sheldon	Archbishop of Canterbury	

== Other ==
Call	Name	Noted for	Notes
1599	Eubule Thelwall	Principal of Jesus College, Oxford	
1602	Simon Archer	antiquary	
1639	Bartholomew Beale	Auditor of the imprests	
1669	John Wynne	industrialist	
1841	Gilbert Abbott à Beckett	Humorist and police magistrate	
1863	John Lee	Astronomer	
1882	Arthur William à Beckett	Journalist and humorist for Punch	
1905	Gurusaday Dutt	Civilian	
1913	Joseph Ball	Intelligence officer with MI5 and first Chairman of the Conservative Research Department	
1913	Thomas Williams Phillips	Permanent Secretary of the Ministry of Labour	
1929	Sophy Sanger	labour law reformer and internationalist	
1951	Huw Thomas	presenter for ITN News	
?	John Finnis	legal academic and philosopher	

== Honorary members ==
Call	Name	Noted for	Notes
1590	John Amy	Civil lawyer	
1606	Francis Barrington	Member of Parliament for Essex	
1942	Winston Churchill	Prime Minister of the United Kingdom	
1943	Franklin D. Roosevelt	President of the United States	
2004	Geoffrey Ma	Chief Justice of the Court of Final Appeal of Hong Kong	

== See also ==
- List of members of Lincoln's Inn
- List of members of Middle Temple
