= Martin Stephen Egonda-Ntende =

Ugandan judge

Justice Martin Stephen Egonda-Ntende
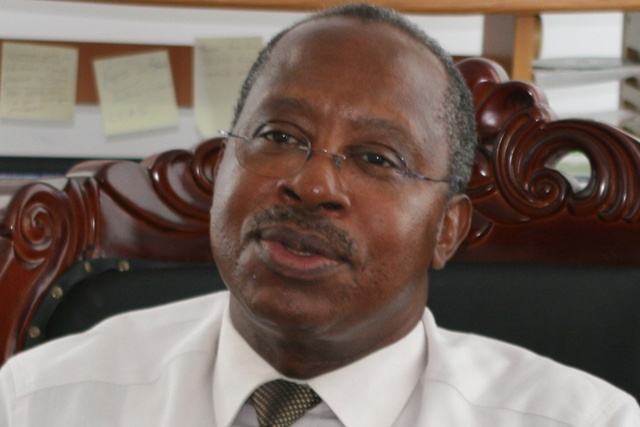
- Egonda-Ntende in 2014

6th Chief Justice of the Supreme Court of Seychelles
- In office August 21, 2009 – 2014
- Appointed by: Constitutional Appointments Authority of Seychelles
- President: James Michel
- Preceded by: Andrew Ranjan Perera
- Succeeded by: Mathilda Twomey

Personal details
- Born: 1956 (age 69–70)
- Profession: Lawyer & Judge

Frederick Martin Stephen Egonda-Ntende (born in 1956) is a Ugandan judge who serves as a Justice of the Court of Appeal of Uganda, which doubles as the Constitutional Court of Uganda. Prior to that, from 2009 until 2014, he served as the Chief Justice of the Seychelles. He was sworn in as Chief Justice on Friday, August 21, 2009 at State House in the Seychelles capital city, Victoria. Prior to that he served as Acting Justice of the Supreme Court of Uganda. He was also involved in the setting up of an independent judiciary in East Timor, where he served as a judge of the Court of Appeal.

== Early life and education ==
Egonda-Ntende was born in 1956, educated at Makerere University and attained a Bachelor of Laws degree, with honors. He also attained postgraduate qualifications including a Post Graduate Diploma in Legal Practice from the Law Development Centre and a Master of Laws degree in Information Technology and Telecommunications Law from the University of Strathclyde, Glasgow, United Kingdom.

== Career ==
Egonda-Ntende Law at Makerere University and was the chairperson of the Law Reporting Committee of the Judiciary in Uganda. Engonda was one of the few advocates practicing in Jinja district in the 1980s and 1990s, after which he we on to become the Vice President of the Uganda Law Society and after, he became the Chairperson of Law Council.

From 1991 to 2000, he was a judge for High Court of Uganda. In 2009 to 2014, he was the Chief Justice, High Court of the Seychelles, Acting Justice, Supreme Court of Uganda from May 2008 to Jan 2009, International Judge, United Nations Mission in Kosovo from 2002 to 2004 where he attained extensive experience in dealing with matters of drug trafficking, a Judge, Court of Appeal of East Timor from 2000 to 2001, Justice, Court of Appeal/Constitutional Court of Uganda from 2000 to date and Judge.

In 2024, Egonda-Ntende was awarded with Doctor of Laws, Honoris Causa of Makerere University in recognition of a distinguished career for over 40 years in legal practice, international adjudication and mediation and academia.
