= Ellen Carolus =

Judge of the Supreme Court of Seychelles

Judge of the Supreme Court of Seychelles
- Incumbent
- Assumed office 8 March 2018

Personal details
- Children: 2
- Education: University of Mauritius

Ellen Carolus is a Seychellois lawyer and judge. She has been judge of the Supreme Court of Seychelles since 2018.

== Career ==
Carolus grew up in Anse Royale, in the island of Mahé.

She began her professional career as a trainee prosecutor at the Attorney General's Office in 1992 and, in 1997, went to study at the University of Mauritius, where she obtained a law degree and was admitted to the bar in 2002 after passing the bar exam. In 2003, she was appointed as a State Counsel and later as Principal State Counsel. In 2008, she took part in a training programme at the Malaysian Institute of Legal Education. The following year, she practised as a lawyer at the Supreme Court of Seychelles.

In 2010, Carolus became Director of Legal Affairs at the Fair Trading Commission before moving into the private sector as legal adviser to Sacos Group Ltd. Since 2012 Carolus has been a full member of the Commonwealth Association of Legislative Counsels. She was appointed Master of the Supreme Court on 7 October 2015 and was sworn in on 9 October 2015 before the president of Seychelles, James Michel.

Michel's successor, Danny Faure, appointed Carolus as a judge of the Supreme Court following a recommendation by the Constitutional Appointments Authority and after consultation with the leader of the opposition, Wavel Ramkalawan, and she was sworn in on 8 March 2018 at the State House.

== Personal life ==
She have two daughters.
