= Francis Chang-Sam =

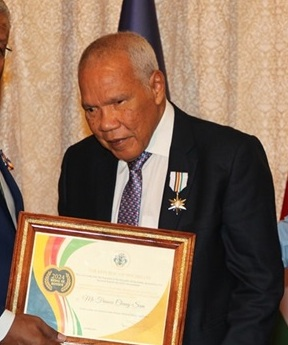
- Chang-Sam in 2024

Attorney General of Seychelles
- In office 1992–1998
- President: France-Albert René
- Preceded by: Pesi Pardiwalla
- Succeeded by: Anthony Fernando

Personal details
- Born: July 30, 1948 Seychelles (then a colony of the United Kingdom)
- Died: May 6, 2025 (aged 76)
- Spouse: Mercedes Chang-Sam
- Education: London School of Economics; King's College London
- Profession: Lawyer

Francis Chang-Sam (born July 30, 1948) was a barrister-at-law of Gray's Inn of London, an attorney-at-law of the Supreme Court of Seychelles, a Notary Public and a Senior Counsel of the Bar Association of Seychelles.

== Career ==
He started his legal career as a state counsel in the Seychelles Department of Legal Affairs headed by the Attorney General. He later held the post of Registrar General in the same Department where he acted as, among others duties, Registrar of Companies, Registrar of Land and Registrar of Trade Marks. He next served as Legal Draftsman and then Principal Legal Draftsman in the Attorney General’s Office specialising in the drafting of legislations, commercial and other legal documents. He later occupied the post of Attorney General for a period of 6 years. He also headed the Secretariat responsible for drafting the Constitution of the Third Republic of Seychelles.

During his time in the public sector, Mr. Chang-Sam served as board member on a number of Government-owned corporations and statutory bodies (including the board of the Central Bank of Seychelles and the board of Air Seychelles).

He also chaired both the National Law and Order Committee and the Constitution Review Committee.
