= Mathilda Twomey =

Seychellois lawyer and academic

Justice Mathilda Twomey-Woods
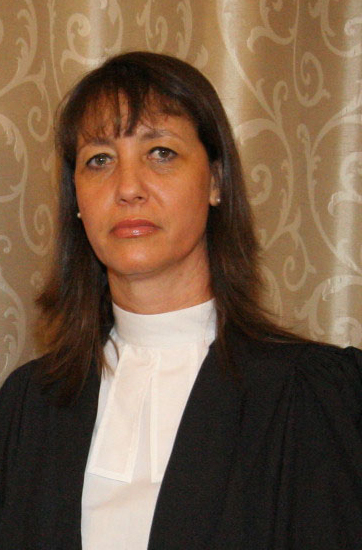

7th Chief Justice of the Supreme Court of Seychelles
- In office 18 August 2015 – September 2020
- Appointed by: Constitutional Appointments Authority of Seychelles
- President: James Michel
- Preceded by: Frederick Egonda-Ntende
- Succeeded by: Rony Goviden

Personal details
- Born: Mathilda Butler-Payette Mahé, Seychelles
- Education: University of Kent; University of Paris-Sud; National University of Ireland
- Profession: Lawyer

Mathilda Twomey-Woods (née Butler-Payette) is a Seychellois lawyer and academic. She is the first female judge in the history of Seychelles and also the first woman to be appointed Chief Justice of the Supreme Court of Seychelles.

== Early life and education ==
Twomey was born in Mahé, Seychelles. She holds a degree in French law from the University of Paris-Sud, France; and also a Bachelors of Arts degree in English and French Law which she obtained from the University of Kent, Canterbury, U.K. She was admitted as a Member of the Bar at Middle Temple, London and as an attorney-at-law in Seychelles in 1987. She holds a master's degree programme in Public Law from the National University of Ireland, Galway; and in 2015, she completed her Ph.D from the same institution.

== Career ==
In 1987, Twomey started her career as a legal practitioner by first serving as a barrister in the Ocean Gate Law Centre. She has also worked in the Attorney General’s Chambers and as an attorney-at-law in private chambers. She was one of the selected members of the Constitutional Commission who were instrumental in drafting the Constitution of the Third Republic between 1992-1993. In 1996, she also worked as regional coordinator for Multiple Sclerosis Ireland, upon moving to Ireland in 1995.

On 13 April 2011, she became the first female judge in Seychelles after she was sworn in as a non-resident judge; and on 18 August 2015, she also became the first woman to be appointed Chief Judge of the Supreme Court of Seychelles after she was sworn in at the State House, Victoria, succeeding Frederick Egonda-Ntende. Her mandate as Chief Justice ended in September 2020. Twomey-Woods continued to serve as Justice of Appeal in the apex court of Seychelles until 30 June 2026. The end of her duties also saw the publication of her Commission of Inquiry into the Lease and development of Assomption Island in the Republic of Seychelles.

https://www.linkedin.com/posts/the-crime-punishment-and-rights-research-share-7477388625752678401-mkXA/

== Published books ==
- Legal Métissage in a Micro-Jurisdiction: The Mixing of Common Law and Civil Law in Seychelles (2017)

== See also ==
- First women lawyers around the world
