= Ephraim Georges =

The Hon. Justice Ephraim Francis Georges is a judge from the Commonwealth of Dominica. He has been a judge in a number of Commonwealth countries and on the Eastern Caribbean Supreme Court.

Georges was called to the bar of England and Wales at the Inner Temple in London in 1965. From 1966 to 1971 he was a legal officer at Friends Provident in London.

In 1971, Georges returned to Dominica and became the Registrar for the courts of Dominica, a position he held until he was appointed as a magistrate in 1974. He served in this capacity until 1976, eventually becoming Chief Magistrate of Dominica. Following the passage of Hurricane David in 1979, Georges relocated to Barbados where he served as a magistrate until 1981, at that time becoming the First Registrar of Titles in Barbados.

From 1984 to 1988 Georges served as a magistrate and intermittently as Registrar for the Supreme Court of Bermuda. For three months, in 1987, he also acted as a justice of the Supreme Court.

From 1989 and 1991, Georges was a justice of the Supreme Court of Seychelles. In 1991, he was appointed by the Judicial and Legal Services Commission of the Caribbean Community to be a High Court Judge of the Eastern Caribbean Supreme Court; he was assigned to reside in and hear cases from Antigua and Barbuda. He served on the court until 2003, including two years as an Acting Appeals Court Judge. He also served as a Judge of the High Court in Tortola, British Virgin Islands from 1994 until 1998. After retiring from the Court in 2003, he was appointed to be an Acting High Court Judge of the Court in 2008; as an Acting High Court Judge, he was assigned to reside in and hear cases from Saint Lucia.
