= List of members of Lincoln's Inn =

The Honourable Society of Lincoln's Inn, commonly known as Lincoln's Inn, is one of the four Inns of Court (professional associations for barristers and judges) in London. Following is a list of some of the notable members of Lincoln's Inn.

== Deceased members ==
- Tun Abdul Razak, 2th prime minister of Malaysia
- Tun Hussein Onn, 3th prime minister of Malaysia
- Mohammad Ali Jinnah, (1876) founder and first Governor General of Pakistan
- A. T. M. Mustafa, (1925) Federal Minister of Pakistan and Cricketer
- S. T. Desai, (1927) Chief Justice of Gujarat and Senior Advocate, Supreme Court of India
- Sir Muhammad Iqbal (Allama Iqbal), (1877) Muslim poet, philosopher and National poet of Pakistan
- H. H. Asquith, (1852) Prime Minister of the United Kingdom and 1st Earl of Oxford and Asquith
- Mirza Hameedullah Beg, (1913) Chief Justice of India
- Richard Bellewe, (1575) legal reporter
- Sir Thomas Berkeley, M.P.
- Kader Bhayat, Minister of Commerce in Mauritius
- Zulfiqar Ali Bhutto, 4th President and 11th Prime Minister of Pakistan
- Henry Buckley, 1st Baron Wrenbury, (1854) a PC and QC who wrote the first edition of Buckley on the Companies Act. He served as a Judge of the High Court of Justice and as a Lord Justice of Appeal. He was then admitted to the Privy Council and elevated to the peerage as Baron Wrenbury
- Richard Cromwell (1626)
- Barun De, (Matriculation: 1954), Chairman, West Bengal Heritage Commission
- Rauf Raif Denktas (1924), vice president of the Republic of Cyprus (1973–1974); founding president of Northern Cyprus
- Lord Denning (1899)
- Frans Dove, Youngest man called to the bar at Lincoln's Inn
- Sir Maurice Drake DFC (1923)
- John Donne (1572)
- Sir John Fortescue,(1394) Lord Chief Justice under King Henry VI of England and jurist
- Monomohun Ghose, (1844) the first Indian to practice at the Calcutta High Court
- Sir Padamji Ginwala (1897) Parsi Barrister and economist from India
- William Ewart Gladstone, (1809) four times Prime Minister of the United Kingdom
- Lord Hailsham of St Marylebone, (1907) former Lord Chancellor
- William Hakewill, M.P., lawyer and antiquary (1574)
- Chaim Herzog, (1918) sixth President of Israel
- Mohammad Hidayatullah, (1905) Chief Justice of India.
- Alfred Paget Humphry (1875), rifle shooter and winner of the 1871 Queen's Prize
- Mustafa Kamal, Chief Justice of Bangladesh
- Makhdoom Khusro Bakhtiar, former minister of planning development & special reforms, minister of national food security of Pakistan, minister of economic affairs of Pakistan
- Sir Muhammad Zafarullah Khan, (1893) Foreign Minister of Pakistan
- Sir Baron Jayatilaka, (1868) Minister for Home Affairs, Ceylon
- Javed Iqbal (Judge), Senior Judge Supreme Court of Pakistan
- Mithan Jamshed Lam, (1898) the first Indian woman Barrister, former Sheriff of Mumbai and Padma Bhushan awardee
- Thomas Langlois Lefroy (1776), Chief Justice of Ireland from 1855 to 1866
- Sir Thomas More (1478)
- John Henry Newman, cardinal (1801)
- William Osgoode, (1754) first Chief Justice of Ontario after whom Osgoode Hall (and by proxy Osgoode Hall Law School) was named
- Apa Saheb Bala Saheb Pant, Indian freedom fighter and diplomat
- Sir James Peiris, (1856) the first elected head of the Legislative Council of Ceylon
- William Pitt the Younger, twice Prime Minister of the United Kingdom (1759)
- Thomas Powys (1794) who was the 2nd Baron Lilford
- William Prynne, 17th century pamphleteer and opponent of Archbishop William Laud (1600)
- Francis Rogers, (1791) judge and author
- William Roper (1496)
- Subimal Chandra Roy, (1971) Judge of the Supreme Court of India.
- Shankar Dayal Sharma, (1918) 9th President of The Republic of India
- Hon. Kenneth George Smith, Chief Justice of Jamaica (1973-1984)
- Sir Nicholas Steward, (1618) 1st Baronet of Hartley Mauditt, MP Lymington, Justice of the Peace (1660) and Deputy Lieutenant of Hampshire (1673 to 1688), Chamberlain of the Exchequer
- Gnanendramohan Tagore, first Asian to be called at the bar
- Margaret Thatcher, former Prime Minister of the United Kingdom
- Sir Nicholas Conyngham Tindal (1776), Chief Justice of the Common Pleas
- Edward Vernon Utterson (c. 1776), lawyer, one of the Six Clerks in Chancery, literary antiquary, collector and editor
- Sir Francis Walsingham (1532)
- Michael Mortimer Wheeler (1915–1992), QC and Deputy High Court Judge, elected Bencher (1967–) and Treasurer (1986–) of the Inn
- William Wingfield, Chief Justice of the Brecon Circuit (1772)
- John Woolley (1846), cricketer
- Sir Anerood Jugnauth, former Prime Minister and President of Mauritius
- Charles Gray QC
- Tun Daim Zainuddin, former Minister of Finance (Malaysia)

== Living members ==
- Hammad Azhar, Member of National Assembly of Pakistan from Lahore, Former Federal Minister for Economic Affairs, Current Federal Minister for Industries and Production
- Brian Gill, Lord Gill, former Lord President and Lord Justice General of Scotland
- Asaduddin Owaisi, Member Of Indian Parliament from Hyderabad, And President of All India Majlis-e-Ittehadul Muslimeen
- Ahmed Ebrahim, justice of the Zimbabwe and Swaziland supreme courts
- Azlan Shah of Perak, former Lord President of Malaysia, Sultan of Perak Darul Ridzuan
- Basdeo Panday, Fifth Prime Minister of Trinidad and Tobago and first Indo-Trinidadian Prime Minister of Trinidad and Tobago
- Sajjad Ali Shah, Chief Justice Of Pakistan
- Adnan Sami, World Famous Singer, Musician and Pianist
- Dr. Kamal Hossain, former Foreign and Law Minister of Bangladesh.
- Muhammad Jamiruddin Sircar, former Acting President, Former Speaker, Minister for Law, Justice and Parliamentary Affairs, Bangladesh
- Chan Sek Keong, former Chief Justice of Singapore.
- Robert Walker, Baron Walker of Gestingthorpe, former Justice of the Supreme Court of the United Kingdom
- Martin Lee, Hong Kong politician. Former leader of the Democratic Party
- Andrew Cheung, incumbent Chief Judge of the High Court of Hong Kong
- John Kufuor, President of Ghana from 2001 to 2009
- Mary Arden (judge), Lady Justice of Appeal of the Royal Courts of Justice
- David Neuberger, Baron Neuberger of Abbotsbury, former President of the Supreme Court of the United Kingdom
- Tony Blair, former Prime Minister of the United Kingdom
- Khalid Jawed Khan, Attorney General of Pakistan
- Makhdoom Ali Khan, former Attorney General of Pakistan
- Cherie Booth QC
- Raja Ashman Shah, Raja Kecil Tengah of Perak Darul Ridzuan (Malaysia)
- Rabinder Singh QC
- Ghulam Muhammad Khan Bhurgri, Pioneer of Pakistan Freedom Movement, first Barrister from Sindh
- Ajmal Mian, Barrister and Former Chief Justice of Pakistan
- Asif Saeed Khan Khosa, Senior Puisne Judge Supreme Court of Pakistan
- Miangul Hassan Aurangzeb, Justice Islamabad High Court
- Nor Hashimah Taib, Attorney General of Brunei

== See also ==
- List of members of Gray's Inn
- List of members of Middle Temple
