= List of members of the Middle Temple =

The Middle Temple is one of the four Inns of Court exclusively entitled to call their members to the English Bar as barristers.

The following notable people were called to the Bar by the Middle Temple.

== Living members ==
- Clive Anderson, television presenter
- David Attard, Malta judge and academics
- Kemal Bokhary, Justice of the Court of Final Appeal, Hong Kong
- Simon Brown, Baron Brown of Eaton-under-Heywood, Justice of the Supreme Court of the United Kingdom
- David Cameron, honorary Bencher, former Prime Minister of the United Kingdom
- Shami Chakrabarti, Director of Liberty
- Anthony Clarke, Baron Clarke of Stone-cum-Ebony, Justice of the Supreme Court of the United Kingdom
- Paul Cohen, barrister and arbitration expert
- William Critchley, author
- Sir Donnell Deeny, Chancery Judge in the High Court of Northern Ireland
- Sir Peter Estlin, former Lord Mayor of London, honorary bencher
- Mónica Feria Tinta, international lawyer, obtained the first international human rights court decision ordering the prosecution of a former Head of State for crimes under international law; co-recipient of the Gruber Justice Prize 2007
- Dr. Darius Furmonavicius, author
- Hon. Mr. Justice André A. Mon Désir (Ret.) Supreme Court of the Republic of Trinidad and Tobago
- Alan Ganoo, Speaker of the National Assembly of Mauritius
- Christopher Geidt, Baron Geidt, honorary Bencher, Chairman of King's College London
- Andrew Gordon-Saker, Senior Costs Judge
- Stephen Hough, pianist and composer
- Geoffrey Howe, senior member of the British Cabinet 1979–1990
- Boris Johnson, Mayor of London, called as an Honorary Bencher on 3 November 2011
- Sir Edwin Jowitt, former High Court judge
- Igor Judge, Baron Judge, Lord Chief Justice of England and Wales
- Anna Lawson, legal scholar, honorary bencher
- Andrew Li, first Chief Justice of the Court of Final Appeal, Hong Kong
- Professor Carl Lygo, Vice-Chancellor, BPP University
- Professor Michael Mainelli, 695th Lord Mayor of the City of London, called as an Honorary Bencher on 2 February 2023
- Sir John Major, honorary Bencher, Prime Minister 1990–1997
- Jonathan Mance, Baron Mance, Justice of the Supreme Court of the United Kingdom
- Donald James Nicholls, Baron Nicholls of Birkenhead, retired Lord of Appeal in Ordinary.
- Nicholas Phillips, Baron Phillips of Worth Matravers, President of the Supreme Court of the United Kingdom
- Anand Ramlogan, SC, human rights attorney, Attorney General of Trinidad and Tobago
- Geoffrey Robertson, Queen's Counsel (QC), constitutional, criminal and media attorney
- Sir Christopher Rose, former judge on the Court of Appeal of England and Wales and a member of the Privy Council of the United Kingdom.
- John Rutter, musician, made an honorary Bencher in 2008
- Mark Rylance, honorary Bencher, awarded in acknowledgement of his 400th anniversary production of Twelfth Night mounted in Hall on 2 February 2002.
- Mark Saville, Baron Saville of Newdigate, British judge and former Justice of the Supreme Court of the United Kingdom.
- George L. Savvides, Attorney-General of the Republic of Cyprus
- Patricia Scotland, Attorney General for England and Wales (until 2010)
- Keir Starmer, Prime Minister of the United Kingdom (since 2024)
- Sir David Steel former Second Sea Lord
- William, Prince of Wales, called to the Bar and made an honorary Bencher in 2009
- Sarah Worthington, Downing Professor of the Laws of England at the University of Cambridge
- Wong Yan Lung, SC, former Hong Kong Secretary for Justice
- Dora Zatte, Ombudsman of the Seychelles

== Deceased members ==
- Charles Abbot, 1st Baron Colchester (1757-1829), British barrister, statesman, Speaker of the House of Commons (1802-1817).
- Peter Ala Adjetey, Speaker of the Parliament of Ghana (2001–2005).
- Alfred Augustus Akainyah (1907-1988), Justice of the Supreme Court of Ghana (1964-1966)
- Edward Akufo-Addo, Chief Justice of Ghana (1966–1970) and President of Ghana (1970–1972)
- Walter Hubert Annenberg (1908-2002), American businessman, investor, philanthropist, diplomat and Honorary Bencher.
- Michael Ashikodi Agbamuche Attorney General & Minister for Justice Nigeria (Sept 1994–1997).
- Fred Kwasi Apaloo (1921-2000), Chief Justice of Ghana (1977 -1986) and later Kenya (1993–1995).
- Robert Ashley (1565-1641), English barrister, politician and translator.
- Sir Anthony Babington, Attorney General for Northern Ireland (1925-1937) and Lord Justice of Appeal (1937-1949)
- Sir Sidney Barton, Consul-General in Shanghai (1922-1929) and Minister to Ethiopia (1929-1936)
- Jyoti Basu (1914-2010), Chief Minister of West Bengal 1977–2000.
- William Draper Best, 1st Baron Wynford (1767-1845), British politician, judge, Chief Justice of the Common Pleas (1824-1829).
- Richard Bethell, 1st Baron Westbury (1800-1873), British barrister, judge and Liberal politician.
- John Bigham, 1st Viscount Mersey (1840-1929), British jurist and politician.
- Sir William Blackstone (1723-1780), jurist and author of Commentaries on the Laws of England
- Womesh Chunder Bonnerjee, First President of Indian National Congress and an barrister of Calcutta High Court
- Birendranath Sasmal, nationalist politician from Midnapore, Secretary of Swaraj Party and eminent barrister, regarded as Deshapran
- Chittaranjan Das, Founder of Swaraj Party and famed lawyer who won many cases against the British Raj, regarded as Deshbandhu
- Sir John Bramston the Elder (1577-1654), English judge, Chief Justice of the King's Bench
- William Thomas Bridges (1821–1894), barrister and public servant in Hong Kong
- Sir Gainsford Bruce (1834-1912), British judge and Conservative politician.
- William Ward Burrows I (1758-1805), Second Commandant of the United States Marine Corps.
- Barbara Calvert (1926-2015), first woman to head a chambers
- Edward Henry Carson, Baron Carson (1854-1935), Irish Unionist politician, barrister and judge.
- Sir Elias Wynne Cemlyn-Jones (1888-1966) Welsh Liberal Party politician.
- John Duke Coleridge, 1st Baron Coleridge (1820-1894), English barrister, judge and Liberal politician.
- William Cowper, 1st Earl Cowper (c.1665-1723), English Whig politician, first Lord High Chancellor of Great Britain (1707-1708, 1714–1718).
- Arthur Geoffrey Neale Cross, Baron Cross of Chelsea (1904-1989), British judge, Lord Appeal in Ordinary.
- Major (Honorary) Basanta Kumar De, Commercial Traffic Manager (Chief of Traffic), Bengal Nagpur Railway
- Brajendranath De, esq., ICS, Magistrate and Collector, Hooghly and Commissioner (Acting), Burdwan, Bengal
- Sanya Dharmasakti, Prime Minister of Thailand (1973–75), President of the Privy Council of Thailand (1975–98)
- Alecos Markides (1943–2020) Attorney General of Cyprus from 1995 to 2003
- Diana, Princess of Wales (1961-1997), Royal Bencher (1988).
- John Dickinson (delegate) (1732-1808), one of the Founding Fathers of the United States.
- William John Kenneth Diplock, Baron Diplock (1907-1985), British judge, Law Lord.
- Theophilus Adebayo Doherty (1895-1974), Nigerian businessman and politician.
- Terence Norbert Donovan, Baron Donovan (1898-1971), British Labour Party politician, Lord of Appeal in Ordinary.
- John Dunning, 1st Baron Ashburton (1731-1783), English barrister and politician.
- Romesh Dutt, ICS, Dewan of Baroda and Commissioner (Acting) of Orissa
- John Edge, Chief Justice in the Allahabad High Court, member of the Council of India and Privy Council
- King Edward VII (1841-1910), Royal Bencher (1861)
- Prince Edward, Duke of Windsor (1894-1972), formerly King Edward VIII, Royal Bencher (1919).
- Sir Walter Egerton KCMG (1858-1947), Governor of Lagos Colony (1904-1906), Southern Nigeria (1906-1912) and British Guiana (1912-1917).
- Queen Elizabeth the Queen Mother (1900-2002), consort of King George VI, Royal Bencher (1944).
- Sir Samuel Thomas Evans (1859-1918), Welsh barrister, judge and Liberal politician.
- Chief Remi Fani-Kayode, the Deputy Premier of Nigeria's Western Region (1963–1966) and the Minister of Chieftaincy and Local Government Affairs for the Western Region (1963–1966).
- Robert Bannatyne Finlay, 1st Viscount Finlay (1842-1929), barrister, doctor and Liberal politician.
- William Finlay, 2nd Viscount Finlay (1875-1945), British judge and peer.
- Sir Andrew Fraser, Lieutenant Governor of Bengal
- Lalmohan Ghosh (1849-1909) Co-founder of Indian National Congress and 1st Indian to stand for election in British Parliament.
- Colin Macdonald Gilray OBE MCE (1885-1974), rugby union player, soldier and educationalist.
- Sir Hildreth Glyn-Jones (1895-1980), barrister and High Court Judge (1953-1968).
- Mervyn Griffith-Jones (1909-1979), British judge.
- Behari Lal Gupta, esq., ICS, Dewan of Baroda and first Indian Chief Presidency Magistrate of Calcutta
- Sir Krishna Govinda Gupta, ICS, Member of the Secretary of State's (for India) Council and Commissioner of Burdwan in Bengal.
- James Hannen, Baron Hannen (1821-1894), English judge.
- Alfred Harmsworth (1837-1889), British barrister.
- Sir Anthony Hart (c.1754-1831), British barrister, Lord Chancellor of Ireland (1827-1830).
- Sir John Anthony Hawke (1869-1941), English judge, Unionist politician.
- Charles Henry Hopwood (1829-1904), British politician and judge.
- John Turner Hopwood (1829-1900), Liberal Party MP and barrister.
- Edward Hyde, 1st Earl of Clarendon (1609-1674), English statesman, Lord Chancellor to King Charles II (1658-1667), royalist and historian.
- Sir Nicholas Hyde (1572-1631), English judge, Lord Chief Justice of England.
- Rufus Daniel Isaacs, 1st Marquess of Reading (1860-1935), British Liberal politician, judge, Lord Chief Justice of England, Viceroy of India and Foreign Secretary.
- Henry James, 1st Baron James of Hereford (1828-1911), Anglo-Welsh barrister and statesman.
- Sir Joseph Jekyll (1663-1738), British barrister, Whig politician and judge.
- Sir Paul Jenkins (lawyer) KCB (1954-2018), Treasury Solicitor.
- William Allen Jowitt, 1st Earl Jowitt (1885-1957), British Labour politician, barrister and Lord High Chancellor of Great Britain (1945-1951).
- Lloyd Kenyon, 1st Baron Kenyon (1732-1802), British politician and barrister.
- Myer Alan Barry King-Hamilton (1904-2010), British barrister and judge.
- Kwa Geok Choo (1920–2010), wife to Singapore Minister Mentor Lee Kuan Yew
- Alfred Tristram Lawrence, 1st Baron Trevethin (1843-1936), British barrister, judge and Lord Chief Justice of England and Wales (1921-1922).
- Sir John Leach (1760-1834), English judge and Master of the Rolls.
- Lee Kuan Yew (1923-2015), first Prime Minister and Minister Mentor of Singapore
- Nathaniel Lindley, Baron Lindley (1828-1921), English judge, Lord of Appeal in Ordinary.
- Colonel Sir Henry Davies Foster Macgeagh (1883-1962), British Judge.
- Sir Charles Mallet (1862-1947), British historian and Liberal politician.
- Phraya Manopakorn Nititada (1884–1948), first prime minister of Thailand (then Siam)
- John Marston (1576–1634), playwright, poet, and satirist
- Rokuichiro Masujima (1857-1948), Japanese lawyer, legal advisor to the Japanese Ambassador in London and founder of Chuo University.
- Sir John Maynard (1602-1690), English barrister and politician.
- V.K. Krishna Menon (1896-1974), Indian nationalist, diplomat, and Defence Minister; cofounder of Penguin and Pelican Books.
- Sir Edward Montagu (c.1485-1557), English barrister and judge.
- Edward Montagu, 1st Earl of Sandwich (1625-1672), English military officer, politician and diplomat.
- Ewen Montague (1901-1985), English judge, Naval intelligence officer and author.
- Henry Montagu, 1st Earl of Manchester (c.1563-1642), English judge, politician and peer.
- Sir Rhys Hopkin Morris (1888-1956), Welsh Liberal politician.
- Michael Nolan, Baron Nolan (1927–2007), jurist and former Lord Justice of Appeal.
- Francis North, 1st Baron Guilford (1637-1685), English judge and Lord Keeper of the Great Seal (1682-1685).
- Roger North (1651–1734), English barrister, biographer and amateur musician.
- Fletcher Norton, 1st Baron Grantley (1716-1789), Solicitor General for England and Wales (1762-1763), Speaker of the House of Commons (1770-1780).
- Fletcher Norton (1744-1820), Scottish barrister, politician, and joint Founder of the Royal Society of Edinburgh (1783).
- Sir James O'Connor (1872-1931), Irish barrister, judge, Solicitor General for Ireland (1914) and Attorney General for Ireland (1917).
- Nii Amaa Ollennu (1906 – 1986), Ghanaian jurist and judge, Justice of the Supreme Court of Ghana, the acting President of Ghana during the Second Republic from 7 August 1970 to 31 August 1970 and the Speaker of the Parliament of Ghana from 1969 to 1972
- Arthur Onslow (1691-1768), English politician, Speaker of the House of Commons (1728-1761).
- K. M. Panikkar, Indian Ambassador to China
- Sardar Vallabhbhai Patel First Home Minister and Deputy Prime Minister of India.
- C. R. Pattabhiraman (1906–2001), Indian lawyer, politician and Union Minister. Eldest son of Sir C. P. Ramaswami Iyer.
- Sir William Peryam (1534-1604), English judge, Lord Chief Baron of the Exchequer.
- Walter Phillimore, 1st Baron Phillimore (1845-1929) British barrister, High Court Judge and Lord Justice of Appeal.
- G.P. Pillai, one of the earliest practising advocates of the High Court of Madras
- Sir Lynden Pindling (1930–2000), First black premier of the Colony of the Bahama Islands from 1967 to 1969 and then first Prime Minister of The Commonwealth of The Bahamas from 1969 to 1992.
- Oswald Pirow (1890-1959), South African lawyer and far right politician.
- Sir Edmund Plowden, (1518–1585), distinguished English lawyer, legal scholar and theorist during the late Tudor period.
- Sir Charles Porter (1631-1696), English-born politician and judge, Lord Chancellor of Ireland.
- Denis Nowell Pritt (1887-1972), British barrister and Labour politician.
- Emmanuel Charles Quist, OBE (1880 – 1959), barrister, educator and judge, first African President of the Legislative Council, the first Speaker of the Gold Coast Legislative Assembly and the first Speaker of the Parliament of Ghana
- Sir Walter Raleigh (c.1554-1618), landed gentleman, writer, poet, soldier, politician, courtier, spy and explorer.
- John Rutledge, Chief Justice of the United States in 1795.
- Sir Eric Sachs (1898-1979), British barrister, High Court Judge and a Lord Justice of Appeal.
- Cyril Barnet Salmon, Baron Salmon (1903-1991), British judge.
- John Sankey, 1st Viscount Sankey (1866-1948), British barrister, judge, Labour politician and Lord High Chancellor of Great Britain.
- Pote Sarasin, Prime Minister of Thailand (1957) secretary-general of SEATO (1958–1964)
- Sir Charles Scarborough (1615-1694), physician to King Charles II and later King James II; King William III and Queen Mary II; and Prince George of Denmark.
- John Scott, 1st Earl of Eldon (1751-1838), British barrister and Tory politician.
- William Scott, 1st Baron Stowell (1745-1836), English judge and jurist.
- Dudley Senanayake (1911–1973), second Prime Minister of Ceylon
- Pixley ka Isaka Seme (c.1881-1951), President of the African National Congress, 1930–1936.
- Sir Barry Shaw, first Director of Public Prosecutions for Northern Ireland
- Jocelyn Edward Salis Simon, Baron Simon of Glaisdale (1911-2006), British judge, Law Lord.
- Sir John Simon (1818-1897), British Jew Serjeant-at-Law and Liberal MP for Dewsbury.
- Raja Sir Maharaj Singh, First Indian Governor of Bombay
- John Somers, 1st Baron Somers (1651-1716), Whig jurist and statesman.
- Sir Wintringham Stable (1888-1977), English barrister and High Court Judge.
- Alexander Martin Sullivan (1871-1959), Irish barrister and the last Serjeant-at-Law.
- Sir Thomas Noon Talfourd (1795-1854), English judge, politician and author.
- Sir Alfred Tobin (1855-1939), British barrister and judge, Conservative MP for Preston (1910-1915).
- Sir Christopher Turnor (1607-1675), English judge, knight and royalist.
- Christopher Machingura Ushewokunze, Minister of Industry and Commerce, Zimbabwe (1992-1994).
- Sir Peyton Ventris (1645-1691), English judge and politician.
- Sir John Verney (1699-1741), British barrister, judge and Tory politician.
- Sir Robert Wallace (1850-1939), Irish-born barrister and Liberal Party politician.
- John Webster (c.1580-c.1634), playwright
- Richard Orme Wilberforce, Baron Wilberforce (1907-2003), British judge.
- Philip Yorke, 1st Earl of Hardwicke (1690-1764), English barrister and politician, Lord High Chancellor of Great Britain (1737-1756).
- Tan Sri Haji Dato' Dr. Abdul Aziz bin Mohd. Zain (1922–2012), former Attorney-General of Brunei (1961-1962), Attorney-General of Malaysia (1963), Federal Court Judge of Malaysia (1964-1970), OIC Secretary-General (1973).
- Somnath Chatterjee, former Speaker of the Lok Sabha of India

== See also ==
- List of members of Gray's Inn
- List of members of Lincoln's Inn
