= Natasha Burian =

Judge of the Supreme Court of Seychelles

Judge of the Supreme Court of Seychelles
- Incumbent
- Assumed office 8 April 2025

Personal details
- Education: University of Reading

Natasha Burian is a Seychellois lawyer and judge. She has been judge of the Supreme Court of Seychelles since 2025.

== Biography ==
Burian studied law at the University of Reading in the United Kingdom. She was admitted as a member of the Honourable Society of the Inner Temple in May 2010.

She practised as a magistrate.

On 8 April 2025, she was appointed to the Supreme Court of Seychelles. She became head of the newly established commercial court.
