= Alexandra Madeleine =

Judge of the Supreme Court of Seychelles

Judge of the Supreme Court of Seychelles
- Incumbent
- Assumed office February 2023

Personal details
- Education: University of Dundee; Ghana School of Law; University of Mauritius

Alexandra Madeleine is a Seychellois jurist who has been a judge of the Supreme Court of Seychelles since 2023.

== Biography ==
She graduated from the University of Dundee, Ghana School of Law and the University of Mauritius.
