= Louis Devaux =

Saint Lucian lawyer and judge (1884–1943)

Sir Justin Louis Devaux (1884– 2 February 1943) was a St Lucian lawyer and colonial judge.

== Biography ==
Born in St Lucia in the West Indies, Devaux was educated at St Mary's College, Castries. He then studied law at Lincoln's Inn, London, where he was "called to the bar" in 1906.

He moved to Canada and practised law in Winnipeg from 1906 to 1916 before returning to St Lucia and joining the Colonial Civil Service. After working for a time as a magistrate, he was sent to the Seychelles in 1919 as a legal advisor. By 1924 he had been elevated to Chief Justice and labelled Tiboulon (Little Bolt) by the locals on account of his stature and large hat.

When a new Governor, Sir Malcolm Stevenson, died shortly after arrival in 1927, Devaux, as Chief Justice, took over as acting Governor. Devaux in turn was soon afterwards replaced as Chief Justice by Robert Vere de Vere but when Vere de Vere arrived in Seychelles Devaux refused to hand over power and secreted the code book and Great Seal of the colony, rendering Vere de Vere helpless until Devaux finally left for his own new post in Jamaica a month later.

In Jamaica he was resident Magistrate until 1931, when he was transferred to Trinidad and Tobago as Solicitor General and from 1935 as Attorney General. On 16 December 1939 he was posted to Mauritius as Chief Justice. He was knighted on 1 January 1943, and a month later he died at his home in Port Louis on the 2 February 1943.
