= Sophy Sanger =

English internationalist and labour-law reformer

Sophy Sanger (1881–1950) was a British internationalist and labour law reformer.

== Early life and education ==
Sophy Sanger was born on 3 January 1881 in Westcott, Surrey. She was the youngest daughter of the wealthy London businessman Charles Sanger and Jessie Alice Pulford. At the age of 15, she was sent to Dr. Elizabeth Dawes' school in Weybridge, where she was the only pupil to be taught mathematics. She went up to Newnham College, Cambridge in autumn 1899. Sophy began by studying the Mathematical Tripos from 1899 to 1902 and went on to read moral sciences in 1903. It was in Cambridge at a debate in the Newnham Parliament that Sophy first became interested in politics; listening to a speech by the Quaker Hilda Clark sparked in her a commitment to pacifism.

== Work ==
Sophy Sanger worked for the Women's Trade Union League from 1903 to 1909, setting up its legal advice bureau whilst learning labour law at University College London. Her work on insurance regulations for workplace compensation meant she was called to give evidence before a parliamentary commission in the House of Lords and she helped Labour MPs prepare their case for the Shops Bill.

In 1905, Sanger founded a British section of the International Association for Labour Legislation, publishing an English version of its French and German Bulletins.

Between 1909 and 1919, she wrote for and edited World's Labour Laws, a quarterly publication which campaigned on issues such as the abolition of child labour, the prohibition of the use of white phosphorus and lead and the prevention of anthrax. She believed that international cooperation and action on specific, practical reforms could effectively combat many worker's rights issues, for example: sweated labour, occupational disease and workplace injury.

Sophy Sanger was appointed chief of the International Labour Organization's legislative section, a post she held from its formation in 1919 until 1924. She returned to Britain in 1924 and read for the bar at Gray's Inn, publishing an authoritative article on labour law for the Encyclopaedia Britannica

Sanger died of illness on 7 December 1950 in Cambridge.
