= Attorney General of Seychelles =

Seychellois government minister

The Attorney General of Seychelles is the head of the Department of Legal Affairs and is responsible for criminal prosecution, civil litigation and notarial work. The chambers advises the government on all legal matters that pertain to international law and relations—in particular, any matters that pertain to international contracting. Additionally, the chambers provides legal advice and services to any government organisations, drafts legislation, and conducts law reform if needed.

While Seychelles also has a Minister of Legal Affairs, the ministerial post is held by the President of Seychelles.

== List of attorneys general ==
This list is incomplete.

- James Michael Homer-Vanniasinkam (fl. 1949)
- Ernest Bernard Simmons, QC (1949–c. 1952)
- André Sauzier (1955–1970)
- James Aiden O'Brien Quinn QC (1972–1976)
- Pesi Pardiwalla SC (1983–1992)
- Francis Chang-Sam SC (1992–1998)
- Anthony Fernando (1999–2008)
- Rony Govinden (2008–2017)*
- Frank Ally SC (2017–present)

*David Esparon served as the Acting Attorney General until Ally assumed the post.

== See also ==
- Attorney general
- Justice ministry
- Politics of Seychelles
- Supreme Court of Seychelles
