= Andrew Ranjan Perera =

Andrew Ranjan Perera was a Sri Lankan judge appointed as the chief justice of Seychelles in 2008.

He was a former puisne justice of the Supreme Court of Sri Lanka.
