= John Wynne (industrialist) =

Welsh industrialist

John Wynne (1650 – 31 December 1714) was a Welsh industrialist, who tried but failed to turn the place where he was born into a centre of the lead industry.

== Life ==
Wynne was born in Trelawnyd (a hamlet of 10 houses near Diserth) in Flintshire, north Wales. Like his father before him (who was also called John), he was educated at Jesus College, Oxford, from 1668, joining Gray's Inn in the following year.

He served as High Sheriff of Flintshire in 1695, as his grandfather (another John) had done in 1677. He thought that Trelawnyd had a role to play in the lead industry and drew up plans to turn it into an industrial town of some importance, building various houses and public buildings (including a non-conformist chapel) and obtaining permission to rename it as "Newmarket" in 1710. The proposed lead works came to nothing, however, and the change of name did not last. Wynne died on 31 December 1714. He left money in his will to establish a grammar school in Newmarket to teach Latin, Greek, French, mathematics and navigation. The school did not survive and the money that Wynne had left to secure its future was wrongfully used elsewhere. The same fate befell the endowment he left to assist poor people in Newmarket.
