= Huw Thomas (newsreader) =

British broadcaster, barrister and politician

Hywel Gruffydd Edward "Huw" Thomas (14 September 1927 – 12 March 2009) was a Welsh broadcaster, barrister and Liberal Party politician.

== Family and education ==
Huw Thomas was born in Pen-bre, near Llanelli, and was a fluent Welsh speaker. He was educated at Ellesmere College in Shropshire, at Aberystwyth University, where he read law, and Queens' College, Cambridge, where he obtained honours in law Tripos. At Cambridge he was vice-president of the Cambridge University Liberal Society and president of the Queen’s College Law Society. While at Aberystwyth he volunteered for RAF aircrew duties and served for four years. He later became a commissioned officer at the Air Ministry. He married his wife Anne in 1960. They had three children.

== Career ==
Thomas was called to the Bar at Gray's Inn and practised as a barrister in London and on the Wales and Chester Circuit. In 1955 he returned to London as an assistant director at the Old Bailey office of the Director of Public Prosecutions.

in 1956 he switched careers and became a newscaster with Independent Television News (ITN), like fellow Liberals Ludovic Kennedy and Robin Day. Like these contemporary interviewers, Thomas gained a reputation for a penetrating style of questioning when it came to public figures, drawing on his courtroom experience of cross-examination. He also did other sorts of television, for example his collaboration with Bernard Braden on the Saturday afternoon sports and current affairs round-up programme, Let’s Go. Thomas later set up his own media consultancy firm, doing PR, producing documentaries and training programmes.

== Politics ==
At the 1950 general election Thomas, aged only 22 years, fought his home seat of Llanelli. He came second in a four-cornered contest, albeit more than 30,000 votes behind the successful Labour candidate and sitting MP Jim Griffiths but he was one of the few Liberal candidates in 1950 who managed to save his deposit.

In 1970 Thomas fought the Welsh seat of Carmarthen. This was Lady Megan Lloyd George’s old seat after she had defected from the Liberals to Labour but in the by-election which followed her death in 1966 the seat had been gained by Plaid Cymru candidate Gwynfor Evans. Labour regained the seat at the 1970 general election but Thomas came a creditable third in a four-cornered contest, gaining over 21% of the poll. Thomas also used his television persona and experience for the Liberals 1970 by presenting election broadcasts. He performed a similar role during the February 1974 general election on the election broadcasts News from the Liberals and Radio Report and again in October 1974.

== Death ==
Huw Thomas died on 12 March 2009 aged 81 years.
