= Gray's Inn =

One of the four Inns of Court in London, England

Coordinates: 51°31′10″N 00°06′44″W

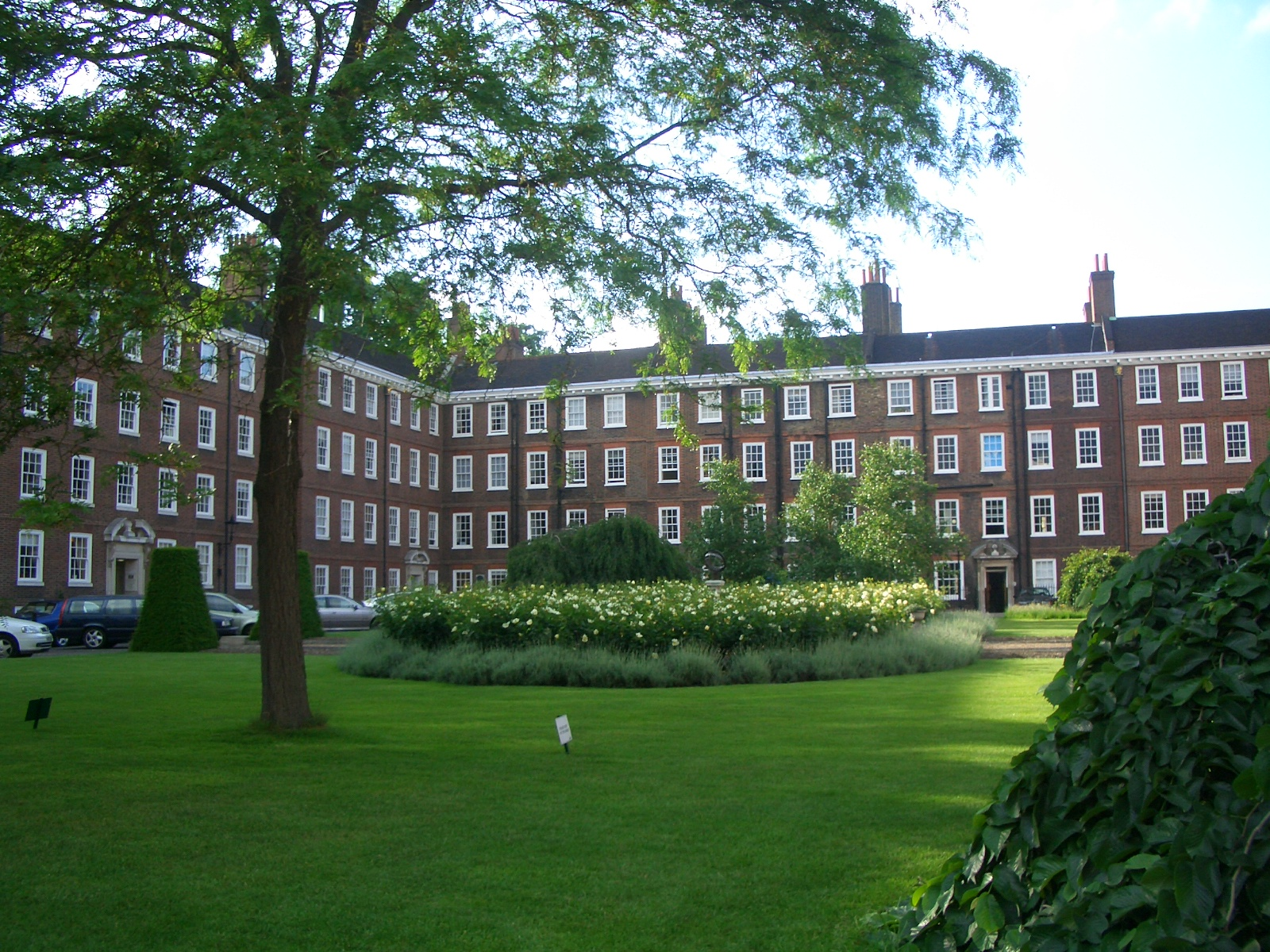
Gray's Inn Square, London

The Honourable Society of Gray's Inn, commonly known as Gray's Inn, is one of the four Inns of Court (professional associations for barristers and judges) in London. To be called to the bar in order to practise as a barrister in England and Wales, an individual must belong to one of these inns. Located at the intersection of High Holborn and Gray's Inn Road in Central London, the Inn is a professional body and provides office and some residential accommodation for barristers. It is ruled by a governing council called "Pension", made up of the Masters of the Bench (or "benchers") and led by the Treasurer, who is elected to serve a one-year term. The Inn is known for its gardens (the "Walks"), which have existed since at least 1597.

Gray's Inn does not claim a specific foundation date; none of the Inns of Court claims to be any older than the others. Law clerks and their apprentices have been established on the present site since at latest 1370, with records dating from 1381. During the 15th and 16th centuries, the Inn grew in size, peaking during the reign of Elizabeth I. The Inn was home to many important barristers and politicians, including Francis Bacon. Queen Elizabeth herself was a patron. As a result of the efforts of prominent members such as William Cecil and Gilbert Gerard, Gray's Inn became the largest of the four Inns by number, with over 200 barristers recorded as members. During this period, the Inn mounted masques and revels. William Shakespeare's The Comedy of Errors is believed first to have been performed in Gray's Inn Hall.

The Inn continued to prosper during the reign of James I (1603–1625) and the beginning of that of Charles I, when over 100 students per year were recorded as joining. The outbreak of the First English Civil War in 1642 during the reign of Charles I disrupted the systems of legal education and governance at the Inns of Court, shutting down all calls to the bar and new admissions, and Gray's Inn never fully recovered. Fortunes continued to decline after the English Restoration, which saw the end of the then-traditional method of legal education. Now more prosperous, Gray's Inn is today the smallest of the Inns of Court.

== Role ==
Arms of the Baron Grey de Wilton, founding 14th-century owner of Gray's Inn

Gray's Inn and the other three Inns of Court remain the only bodies legally allowed to call a barrister to the Bar, allowing him or her to practise in England and Wales. Although the Inn was previously a disciplinary and teaching body, these functions are now shared between the four Inns, with the Bar Standards Board (a division of the General Council of the Bar) acting as a disciplinary body and the Inns of Court and Bar Educational Trust providing education. The Inn remains a collegiate self-governing, unincorporated association of its members, providing within its precincts library, dining, residential and office accommodation (barristers' chambers), along with a chapel. Members of the Bar from other Inns may use these facilities to some extent.

== History ==
During the 12th and early 13th centuries, the law was taught in the City of London, primarily by the clergy. Then two events happened which ended the Church's role in legal education: firstly, a papal bull that prohibited the clergy from teaching the common law, rather than canon law; and secondly, a decree by Henry III of England on 2 December 1234 that no institutes of legal education could exist in the City of London. The common law began to be practised and taught by laymen instead of clerics, and these lawyers migrated to the hamlet of Holborn, just outside the city and near to the law courts at Westminster Hall.

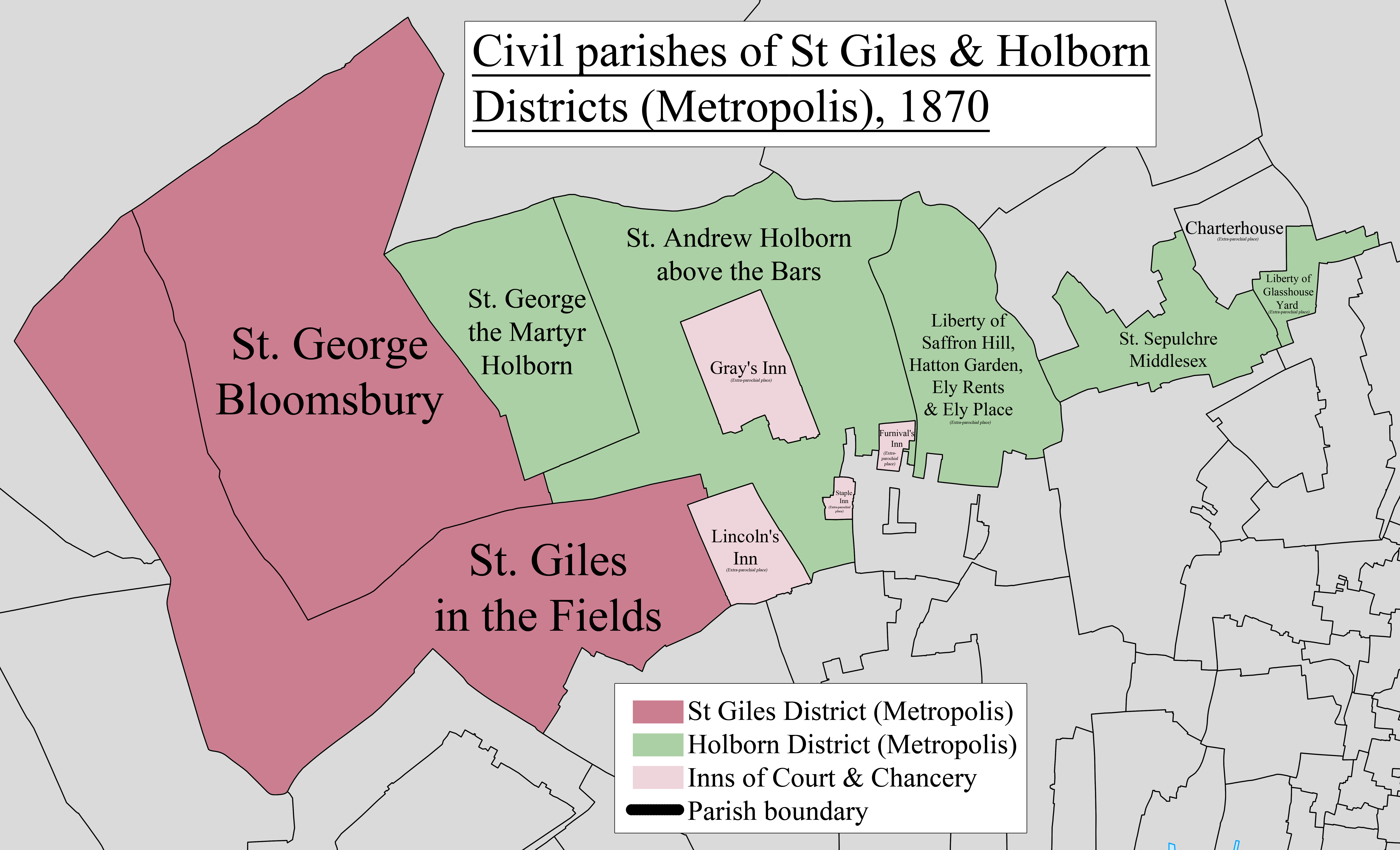
A map showing the boundaries of the Inn in 1870

=== Founding and early years ===
The early records of all four Inns of Court have been lost, and it is not known precisely when each was founded. The records of Gray's Inn itself are lost until 1569, and the precise date of founding cannot therefore be verified. Lincoln's Inn has the earliest surviving records. Gray's Inn dates from at least 1370, and takes its name from the 1st Baron Grey de Wilton, as the Inn was originally Lord Grey's family townhouse (or inn) within the Manor of Portpoole. A lease was taken for various parts of the inn by practising lawyers as both residential and working accommodation, and their apprentices were housed with them. From this the tradition of dining in "commons", probably by using the inn's main hall, followed as the most convenient arrangement for the members. Outside records from 1437 show that Gray's Inn was occupied by socii, or members of a society, at that date.

In 1456 the 7th Baron Grey de Wilton, the owner of the Manor itself, sold the land to a group including Thomas Bryan. A few months later, the other members signed deeds of release, granting the property solely to Bryan. Bryan acted as either a feoffee or an owner representing the governing body of the Inn (there are some records suggesting he may have been a Bencher at this point) but in 1493 he transferred the ownership by charter to a group including Sir Robert Brudenell and Thomas Wodeward, reverting the ownership of the Inn partially back to the Grey family.

In 1506 the Inn was sold by the Grey family to Hugh Denys and a group of his feoffees including Roger Lupton. This was not a purchase on behalf of the society and after a five-year delay, it was transferred under the will of Denys in 1516 to the Carthusian House of Jesus of Bethlehem (Sheen Priory), which remained the Society's landlord until 1539, when the Second Act of Dissolution led to the Dissolution of the Monasteries and passed ownership of the Inn to the Crown.

=== Elizabethan golden age ===
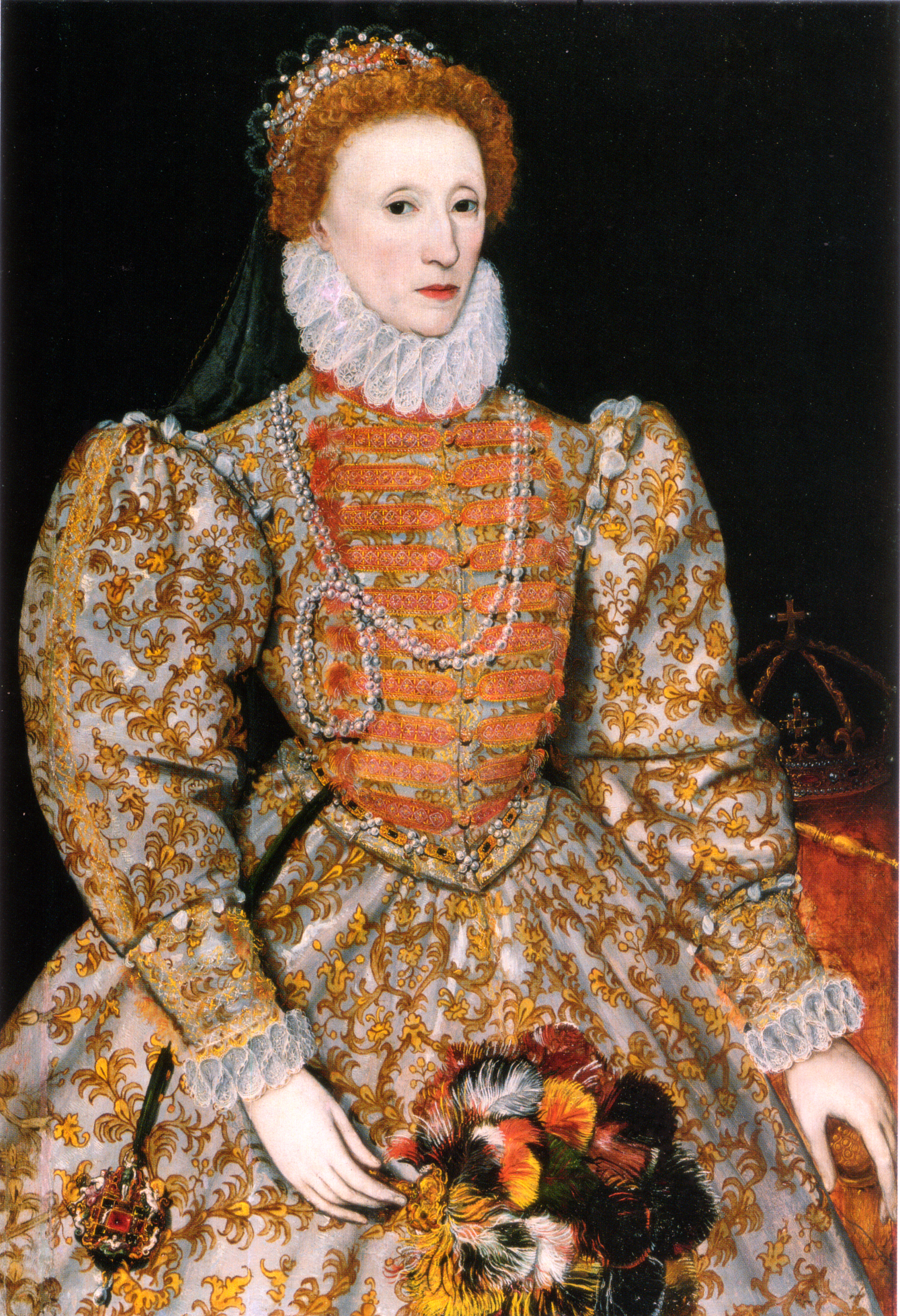
Elizabeth I of England, who served as the Inn's patron during its "golden age"

During the reign of Elizabeth I, Gray's Inn rose in prominence, and the Elizabethan era is hailed as the "golden age" of the Inn, with Elizabeth serving as the Patron Lady. This can be traced to the actions of Nicholas Bacon, William Cecil and Gilbert Gerard, all prominent members of the Inn and confidantes of Elizabeth. Cecil and Bacon in particular took pains to find the most promising young men and get them to join the Inn. In 1574 it was the largest of all the Inns of Court by number, with 120 barristers, and by 1619 it had a membership of more than 200 barristers.

Gray's Inn, as well as the other Inns of Court, became noted for the parties and festivals it hosted. Students performed masques and plays in court weddings, in front of Queen Elizabeth herself, and hosted regular festivals and banquets at Candlemas, All Hallows Eve and Easter. At Christmas the students ruled the Inn for the day, appointing a Lord of Misrule called the Prince of Purpoole, and organising a masque entirely on their own, with the Benchers and other senior members away for the holiday.

The Gray's Inn masque in 1588 with its centrepiece, The Misfortunes of Arthur by Thomas Hughes, is held by A. W. Ward to be the most impressive masque thrown at any of the Inns. William Shakespeare performed at the Inn at least once, as his patron, Lord Southampton, was a member. For the Christmas of 1594, his play The Comedy of Errors was performed by the Lord Chamberlain's Men before a riotous assembly of notables in such disorder that the affair became known as the Night of Errors and a mock trial was held to arraign the culprit.

Central to Gray's was the system shared across the Inns of Court of progress towards a call to the Bar, which lasted approximately 12 to 14 years. A student would first study at either Oxford or Cambridge University, or at one of the Inns of Chancery, which were dedicated legal training institutions. If he studied at Oxford or Cambridge he would spend three years working towards a degree, and be admitted to one of the Inns of Court after graduation. If he studied at one of the Inns of Chancery he would do so for one year before seeking admission to the Inn of Court to which his Inn of Chancery was tied—in the case of Gray's Inn, the attached Inns of Chancery were Staple Inn and Barnard's Inn.

The student was then termed "an inner barrister", and would study in private, take part in the moots and listen to the readings and other lectures. After serving from six to nine years as an "inner barrister", the student was called to the Bar, assuming he had fulfilled the requirements of having argued twice at moots in one of the Inns of Chancery, twice in the Hall of his Inn of Court and twice in the Inn Library. The new "utter barrister" was then expected to supervise bolts ("arguments" over a single point of law between students and barristers) and moots at his Inn of Court, attend lectures at the Inns of Court and Chancery and teach students. After five years as an "utter" barrister he was allowed to practice in court—after 10 years he was made an Ancient.

The period saw the establishment of a regular system of legal education. In the early days of the Inn, the quality of legal education had been poor—readings were given infrequently, and the standards for call to the Bar were weak and varied. During the Elizabethan age readings were given regularly, moots took place daily and barristers who were called to the Bar were expected to play a part in teaching students, resulting in skilled and knowledgeable graduates from the Inn.

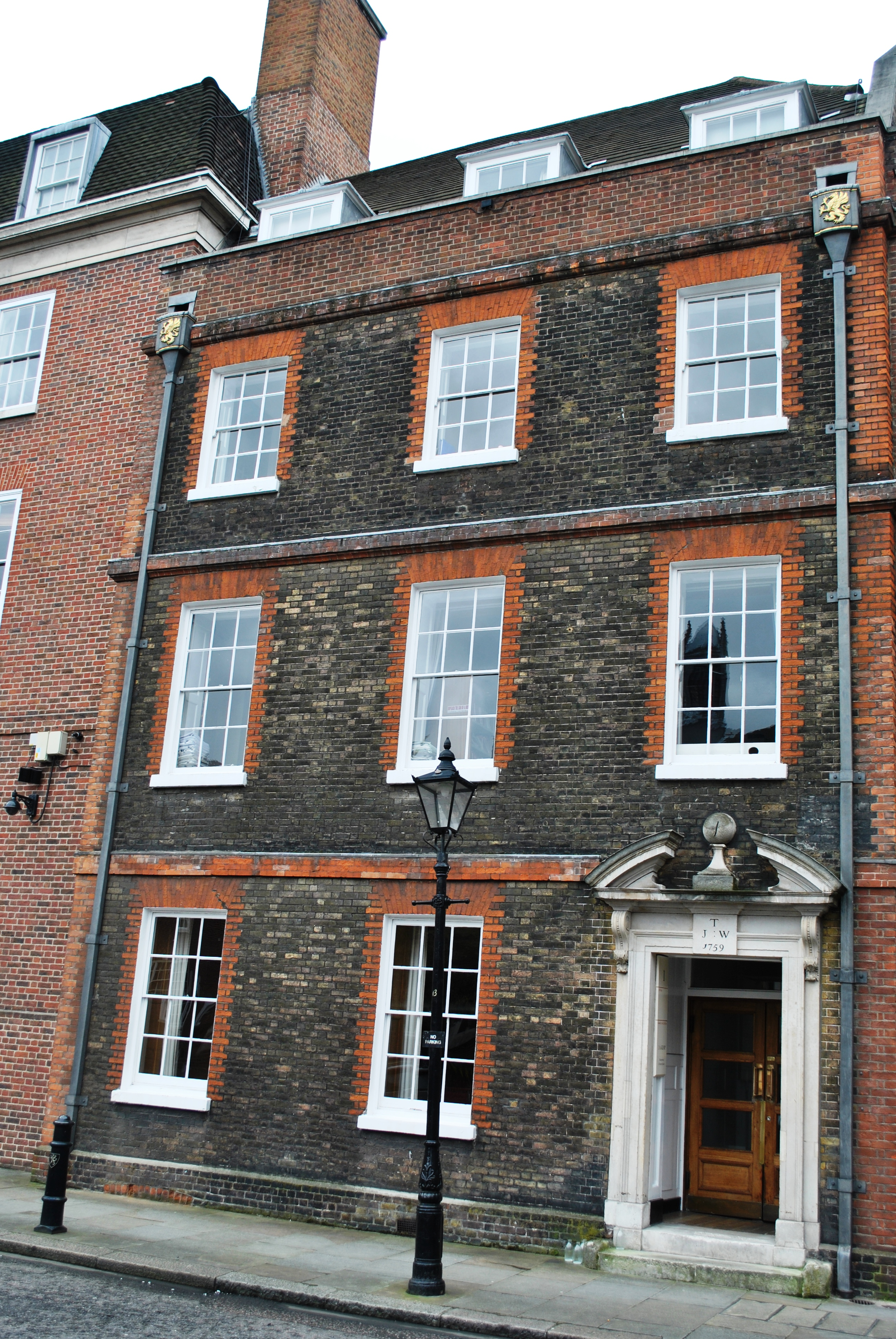
Francis Bacon House at Gray's Inn

Many noted barristers, judges and politicians were members of the Inn during this period, including Gilbert Gerard, Master of the Rolls, Edmund Pelham, Lord Chief Justice of Ireland, and Francis Bacon, who served as Treasurer for eight years, supervising significant changes to the facilities of the Inn and the first proper construction of the gardens and walks for which the Inn is noted.

=== Caroline period and the English Civil War ===
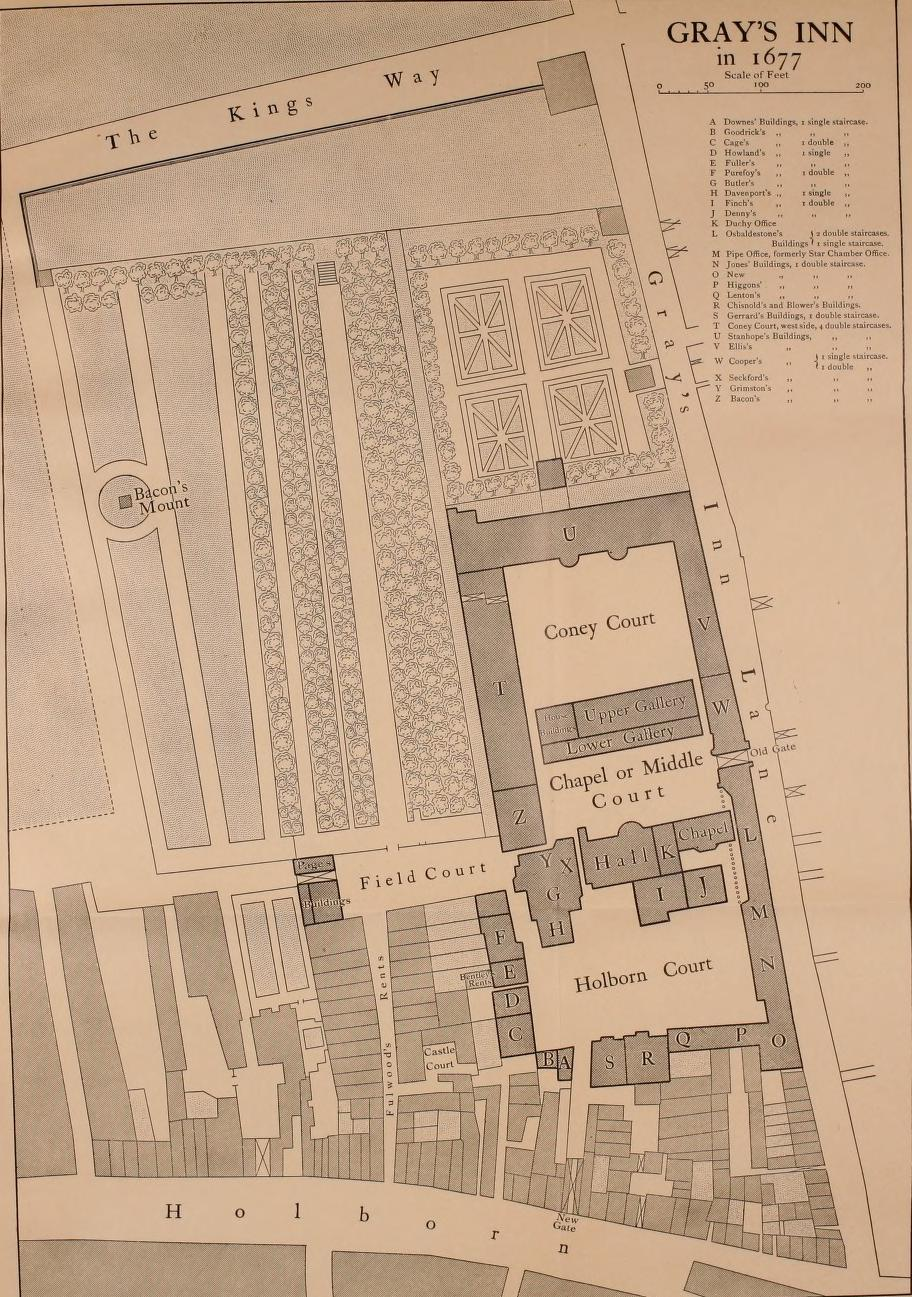
A 1677 map of Gray's Inn at Holborn

At the start of the Caroline era, when Charles I came to the throne, the Inn continued to prosper. Over 100 students were admitted to the Inn each year, and except during the plague of 1636 the legal education of students continued. Masques continued to be held, including one in 1634 organised by all four Inns that cost £21,000—approximately £4,082,000 in 2025 terms. Before 1685 the Inn counted as members five dukes, three marquises, twenty-nine earls, five viscounts and thirty-nine barons, and during that period "none can exhibit a more illustrious list of great men".

Many academics, including William Holdsworth, reputed to be one of the best legal academics in history, maintain that this period saw a decline in the standard of teaching at all the Inns. From 1640 onwards no readings were held, and barristers such as Sir Edward Coke remarked at the time that the quality of education at the Inns of Court had decreased. Holdsworth put this down to three things—the introduction of printed books, the disinclination of students to attend moots and readings and the disinclination of the Benchers and Readers to enforce attendance.

With the introduction of printing, written legal texts became more available, reducing the need for students to attend readings and lectures. However, this meant that the students denied themselves the opportunity to query what they had learnt or discuss it in greater detail. Eventually, as students now had a way to learn without attending lectures, they began to excuse themselves from lectures, meetings and moots altogether; in the early 17th century they developed a way of deputising other students to do their moots for them. The Benchers and Readers did little to arrest the decline of the practice of lecturers and readings, first because many probably believed (as the students did) that books were an adequate substitute, and secondly because many were keen to avoid the work of preparing a reading, which cut into their time as practising barristers. These problems were endemic to all the Inns, not just Gray's Inn.

The outbreak of the First English Civil War led to a complete suspension of legal education, and from November 1642 until July 1644 no Pension meetings were held. Only 43 students were admitted during the four years of the war, and none were called to the Bar. Meetings of Pension resumed after the Battle of Marston Moor but the education system remained dormant. Although Readers were appointed, none read, and no moots were held. In 1646, after the end of the war, there was an attempt to restore the old system of readings and moots, and in 1647 an order was made that students were required to moot at least once a day. This failed to work, with Readers refusing to read, and the old system of legal education completely died out.

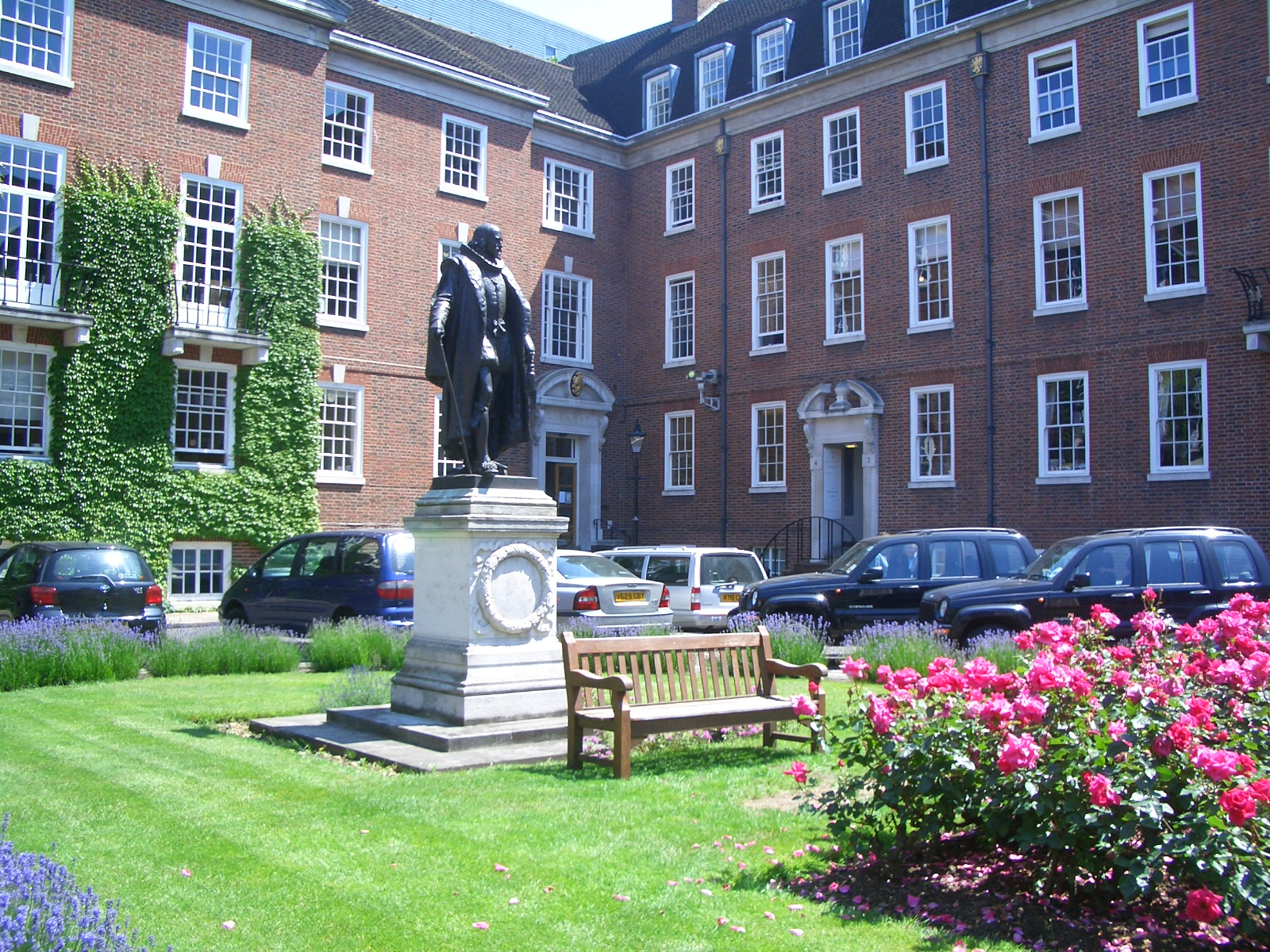
South Square, Gray's Inn, WC1

The Caroline period saw a decline in prosperity for Gray's Inn. Although there were many notable members of the Inn, both legal (Sir Dudley Digges, Thomas Bedingfield and Francis Bacon, for example) and non-legal (including William Juxon, the Archbishop of Canterbury), the list could not compare to that of the Elizabethan period. Following the English Restoration, admissions fell to an average of 57 a year.

=== English Restoration to present ===
The fortunes of Gray's Inn continued to decline after the English Restoration, and by 1719 only 22 students were joining the Inn a year. This fall in numbers was partly because the landed gentry were no longer sending sons who had no intention of becoming barristers to study at the Inn. In 1615, 13 students joined the Inn for every student called to the Bar, but by 1713 the ratio had become 2.3 new members to every 1 call.

Over a 50-year period, the Civil War and high taxation under William III economically crippled many members of the gentry, meaning that they could not afford to allow their sons to study at the Inns. David Lemmings considers it to have been more serious than that, for two reasons; firstly, Inner Temple and Middle Temple had actually shown an increase in membership following the Restoration, and secondly because Gray's Inn had previously had far more "common" members than the other Inns. The decrease in the number of gentry at the Inn could therefore not completely explain the large drop in members.

A field in the Gray's Inn area was the venue for a cricket match in July 1730 between London and Kent. The original source reports "a cricket-match between the Kentish men and the Londoners for £50, and won by the former", giving the precise location as "a field near the lower end of Gray's Inn Lane, London".

In 1733 the requirements for a call to the Bar were significantly revised in a joint meeting between the Benchers of Inner Temple and Gray's Inn, revisions accepted by Lincoln's Inn and Middle Temple, although they were not represented. It is not recorded what these changes were, but after a further discussion in 1762 the Inns adopted a rule that any student with a Master of Arts or Bachelor of Laws degree from the universities of Oxford or Cambridge could be called to the Bar after three years as a student, and any other student could be called after five years. An attempt was made to increase the quality of legal education at Gray's Inn; in 1753 a barrister, Danby Pickering, was employed to lecture there, although this agreement ended in 1761 when he was called to the Bar.

The 18th century was not a particularly prosperous time for the Inn or its members, and few notable barristers were members during this period. Some noted members include Sir Thomas Clarke, the Master of the Rolls, Sir James Eyre, Chief Justice of the Common Pleas and Samuel Romilly, a noted law reformer. In 1780 the Inn was involved in the case of R v the Benchers of Gray's Inn, a test of the role of the Inns of Court as the sole authority to call students to the Bar. The case was brought to the Court of King's Bench by William Hart, a student at the Inn, who asked the court (under Lord Mansfield) to order the Inn to call him to the Bar. Mansfield ruled that the Inns of Court were indeed the only organisations able to call students to the Bar, and refused to order the Inns to call Hart.

During the 19th century, the Inns began to stagnate; little had been changed since the 17th century in terms of legal education or practice, except that students were no longer bound to take the Anglican sacrament before their call to the Bar. In 1852 the Council of Legal Education was established by the Inns, and in 1872 a formal examination for the call to the Bar was introduced. Gray's Inn itself suffered more than most; as in the 18th century, the fortunes of its members declined, and many barristers who had been called to the Bar at the Inn transferred to others.

On 5 March 1903, Bertha Cave applied to become the first female member of Gray's Inn because it was necessary to be a member of one of the Inns of Court in order to be called to the Bar. She was denied entry, with the committee writing in part that "males, and males alone, were to be admitted to practise at the bar". Cave appealed and in December of the same year, the case was heard in the House of Lords; again, she was unsuccessful.

Gray's Inn was the smallest of the Inns during the early 20th century, and was noted for its connection to the Northern Circuit. During a 1918 Allied World War I conference it would be the site where Franklin D. Roosevelt and Winston Churchill, the future leaders of the Western Allies in World War II, would first meet.

Following the passage of the Sex Disqualification (Removal) Act in December 1919, women could be admitted to the Inns of Court. The first three women were admitted in 1920. Mary Selina Share Jones (1874–1954) was admitted on 27 Jan 1920 following a law degree from the University of Liverpool but was not called, going on to qualify as a medical doctor instead. Edith Hesling (1899–1971) was admitted on 4 October 1920 while studying for a law degree at the University of Manchester. On 13 June 1923 she became the first woman called to the Bar at Gray's Inn. (Mary) Robina Stevens (1903–51) was admitted on 8 October 1920 whilst studying at London University. She was called on 28 January 1924.

During World War II the Inn was badly damaged during the Blitz in 1941, with the Hall, the chapel, the Library and many other buildings hit and almost destroyed. The rebuilding of much of the Inn took until 1960 by the architect Sir Edward Maufe. In 2008 Gray's Inn became the first Inn to appoint "fellows"—elected businesspeople, legal academics and others—with the intent of giving them a wider perspective and education than the other Inns would offer.

== Structure and governance ==
Gray's Inn's internal records date from 1569, at which point there were four types of member; those who had not yet been called to the Bar, Utter Barristers, Ancients and Readers. Utter Barristers were those who had been called to the Bar but were still studying, Ancients were those who were called to the Bar and were allowed to practise and Readers were those who had been called to the Bar, were allowed to practise and now played a part in educating law students at the Inns of Chancery and at Gray's Inn itself. At the time Gray's Inn was the odd one out amongst the Inns; the others did not recognise Ancients as a degree of barrister and had Benchers roughly corresponding to the Readers used at Gray's Inn (although the positions were not identical).

The Inn is run by Pension, its ultimate governing body. The name is peculiar to Gray's Inn—at Lincoln's Inn the governing body is called the council, and at the Inner and Middle Temples it is called the Parliament. The name was used for the governing bodies of three of the Inns of Chancery—Barnard's Inn, Clement's Inn and New Inn. In Gray's Inn the Readers, when they existed, were required to attend Pension meetings, and other barristers were at one point welcome to, although only the Readers would be allowed to speak. Pension at Gray's Inn is made up of the Masters of the Bench, and the Inn as a whole is headed by the Treasurer, a senior Bencher. The Treasurer has always been elected, and since 1744 the office has rotated between individuals, with a term of one year.

On 31 March 1932 the civil parish was abolished and merged with Holborn. At the 1931 census (the last before the abolition of the parish), Grays Inn had a population of 152.

=== Readers ===
A Reader was a person literally elected to read—he would be elected to the Pension (council) of Gray's Inn, and would take his place by giving a "reading", or lecture, on a particular legal topic. Two Readers would be elected annually by Pension to serve a one-year term. Initially (before the rise of the Benchers) the Readers were the governing body of Gray's Inn, and formed Pension. The earliest certain records of Readers are from the 16th century—although the Inn's records only start at 1569. William Dugdale (himself a member) published a list in his Origines Juridiciales dating from 1514. S.E. Thorne published a list dating from 1430, but this is entirely conjectural and not based on any official records, only reports of "readings" that took place at Gray's Inn. By 1569 there had certainly been Readers for more than a century.

The English Civil War marked the end of legal education at the Inns, and the class of Readers went into decline. The last Readers were appointed in 1677, and the position of the Readers as heads of the Inn and members of Pension was taken by the Benchers.

=== Benchers ===
A Bencher, Benchsitter or (formally) Master of the Bench is a member of Pension, the governing body of the Honourable Society of Gray's Inn. The term originally referred to one who sat on the benches in the main hall of the Inn which were used for dining and during moots, and the term originally had no significance. The position of Bencher developed during the 16th century when the Readers, for unknown reasons, decided that some individual barristers who were not Readers should be afforded the same rights and privileges as those who were, although without a voice in Pension. This was a rare practice and occurred a total of seven times within the 16th century, the first being Robert Flynt in 1549. The next was Nicholas Bacon in 1550, then Edward Stanhope in 1580, who was afforded the privilege because, although a skilled attorney, an illness meant he could never fulfil the duties of a Reader.

The practice became more common during the 17th century—11 people were made Benchers between 1600 and 1630—and in 1614 one of the Benchers appointed was explicitly allowed to be a member of Pension. This became more common, creating a two-rank system in which both Readers and Benchers were members of Pension. However, far more Readers were appointed than Benchers—50 between 1600 and 1630—and it appeared that Readers would remain the higher rank despite this change.

The outbreak of the First English Civil War in 1642 marked the end of legal education at the Inns, although Parliament attempted to persuade Readers to continue by threatening them with fines. The class of Readers went into decline and Benchers were called as members of Pension instead. In 1679 there was the first mass-call of Benchers (22 on one occasion, and 15 on another), with the Benchers paying a fine of 100 marks because they refused to read, and modern Benchers pay a "fine" in a continuation of this tradition.

Noted Benchers of Gray's Inn include Lord Birkenhead and Francis Bacon. Honorary Benchers can also be appointed, although they have no role in Pension, such as Lord Denning, who was appointed in 1979, and Winston Churchill. Today there are over 300 Benchers in Gray's Inn, mostly senior barristers and members of the judiciary.

=== Badge ===
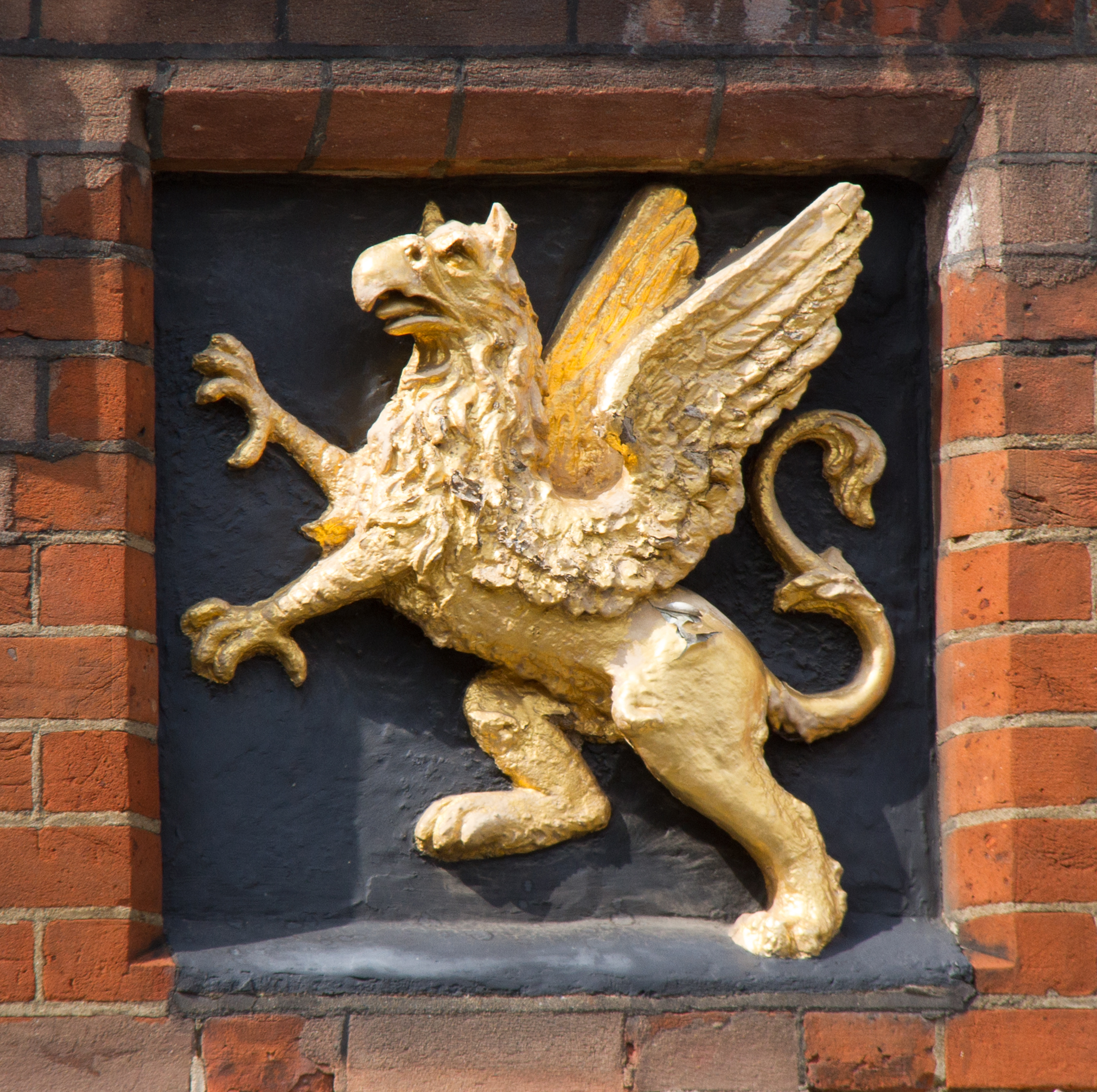
The Gray's Inn badge (a gold griffin on a black field)

Gray's Inn does not possess a coat of arms per se but instead uses a heraldic badge, which is often displayed on a shield. It is a gold griffin on a black background, and is blazoned either "Azure an Indian Griffin proper segreant" or, more currently, "Sable a griffin segreant or". The Inn originally used a variant of the coat of arms of the Grey family, but this was changed to the griffin at some time around the 1590s. There is no record of why this was done, but it is possible that the new emblem was adapted from the arms of the Treasurer Richard Aungier (d. 1597).

The Inn's motto, the date of adoption of which is unknown, is Integra Lex Aequi Custos Rectique Magistra Non Habet Affectus Sed Causas Gubernat, which is Latin for 'Impartial justice, guardian of equity, mistress of the law, without fear or favour rules men's causes aright'. The seal of Gray's Inn consists of the badge encircled by the motto.

== Buildings and gardens ==
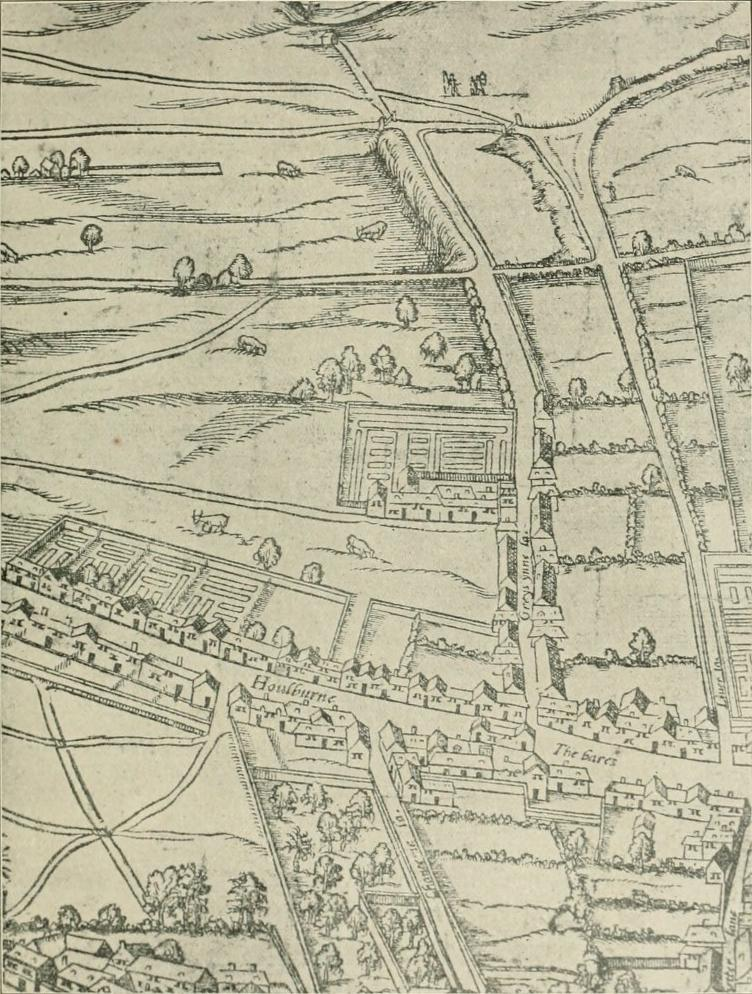
The Inn's buildings and walks, in a compound on the left-hand side of "Greys ynne la.", shown on the "Woodcut" map of London of the 1560s

The Inn is located at the intersection of High Holborn and Gray's Inn Road. It started as a single manor house with a hall and chapel, although an additional wing had been added by the date of the "Woodcut" map of London, drawn probably in the early 1560s. Expansion continued over the following decades, and by 1586 the Pension had added another two wings around the central court. Around these were several sets of barristers' chambers erected by members of the Inn under a leasehold agreement whereby ownership of the buildings would revert to the Inn at the end of the lease.

As the Inn grew it became necessary (for safety purposes) to wall off the land owned by the Inn, which had previously been open to everyone. In 1591 the "back field" was walled off, but little more was done until 1608, when under the supervision of Francis Bacon, the Treasurer, more construction work was undertaken, particularly in walling off and improving the gardens and walks. In 1629 it was ordered that an architect supervise any construction and ensure that the new buildings were architecturally similar to the old ones, and the strict enforcement of this rule during the 18th century is given as a reason for the uniformity of the buildings at Gray's Inn.

During the late 17th century many buildings were demolished, either because of poor repair or to standardise and modernise the buildings at the Inn. Many more were built over the open land surrounding the Inn, although this was controversial at the time; in November 1672 the Privy Council and Charles II himself were petitioned to order that nothing should be built on the open land, and a similar request was sent to the Lord Chancellor in May 1673. From 1672 to 1674 additional buildings were constructed in the Red Lyon Fields by Nicholas Barebone, and members of the Inn attempted to sue him to prevent this. After the lawsuits failed members of the Inn were seen to fight with Barebones' workmen, "wherein several were shrewdly hurt".

In February 1679 a fire broke out on the west side of Coney Court, necessitating the rebuilding of the entire row. Another fire broke out in January 1684 in Coney Court, destroying several buildings including the Library. A third fire in 1687 destroyed a large part of Holborn Court, and when the buildings were rebuilt after these fires they were constructed of brick to be more resistant to fire than the wood and plaster previously used in construction. As a result, the domestic Tudor style architecture which had dominated much of the Inn was replaced with more modern styles. Records show that prior to the rebuilding in 1687, the Inn had been "so incommodious" that the "ancients" were forced to work two to a chamber. More of the Inn was rebuilt during that period, and between 1669 and 1774 all of the Inn apart from parts of the Hall and Chapel had been rebuilt.

More buildings were constructed during the 18th and 19th centuries. In 1941 the Inn suffered under The Blitz, which damaged or destroyed much of the Inn, necessitating the repair of many buildings and the construction of more. Today many buildings are let as professional offices for barristers and solicitors with between 265,000 sq ft (24,600 m^{2}) and 275,000 sq ft (25,500 m^{2}) of office space available. There are also approximately 60 residential apartments, rented out to barristers who are members of the Inn. The Inn also contains the Inns of Court School of Law, a joint educational venture between all four Inns of Court where the vocational training for barristers and solicitors is undertaken. The current Inn layout consists of two squares—South Square and Gray's Inn Square—with the remaining buildings arranged around the Walks.

=== Hall ===
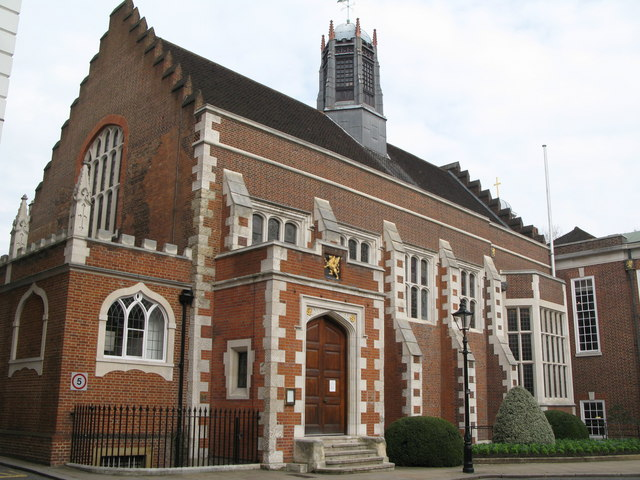
Gray's Inn Hall, London WC1

The Hall was part of the original Manor of Portpoole, although it was significantly rebuilt during the reign of Mary I, and again during the reign of Elizabeth, with the rebuilding being finished on 10 November 1559. The rebuilt Hall measured 70 ft (21 m) in length, 35 ft (11 m) in width and 47 ft (14 m) in height, and remains about the same size today. It has a hammerbeam roof and a raised dais at one end with a grand table on it, where the Benchers and other notables would originally have sat.

The hall also contains a large carved screen at one end covering the entrance to the Vestibule. Legend says that the screen was given to the Inn by Elizabeth I while she was the Inn's patron, and is carved out of the wood of a Spanish galleon captured from the Spanish Armada. The Hall was lit with the aid of massive windows filled with the Coats of Arms of those members who became Treasurers. The Benchers' table is also said to have been a gift from Elizabeth, and as a result the only public toast in the Inn until the late 19th century was "to the glorious, pious and immortal memory of Queen Elizabeth".

The walls of the Hall are decorated with paintings of noted patrons or members of the Inn, including Nicholas Bacon and Elizabeth I. During the Second World War the Hall was one of those buildings badly damaged during the Blitz. The Treasurers' Arms and paintings had been moved to a place of safety and were not damaged; during the rebuilding after the War they were put back in the Hall, where they remain. The rebuilt hall was designed by Edward Maufe, and was formally opened in 1951 by the Duke of Gloucester.

=== Chapel ===
The Chapel existed in the original manor house used by the Inn, and dates from 1315. In 1625 it was enlarged under the supervision of Eubule Thelwall, but by 1698 it was "very ruinous", and had to be rebuilt. Little is known of the changes, except that the barristers' chambers above the chapel were removed. The building was again rebuilt in 1893, and remained that way until its destruction during The Blitz in 1941. The chapel was finally rebuilt in 1960, and the original stained glass windows (which had been removed and taken to a safe location) were restored. The rebuilt Chapel contains "simple furnishings" made of Canadian maple donated by the Canadian Bar Association.

The Inn has had a Chaplain since at least 1400, where a court case is recorded as being brought by the "Chaplain of Greyes Inn". During the 16th century the Inn began hiring full-time preachers to staff the Chapel—the first, John Cherke, was appointed in 1576. A radical Puritan in a time of religious conflict, Cherke held his post for only a short time before being replaced by a Thomas Crooke in 1580. After Crooke's death in 1598 Roger Fenton served as preacher, until his replacement by Richard Sibbes, later Master of Catherine Hall, Cambridge, in 1616. Gray's Inn still employs a Preacher; Michael Doe, former Bishop of Swindon and more recently General Secretary of the United Society for the Propagation of the Gospel, was appointed in 2011. The East window is by George Ostrehan.

=== Walks ===
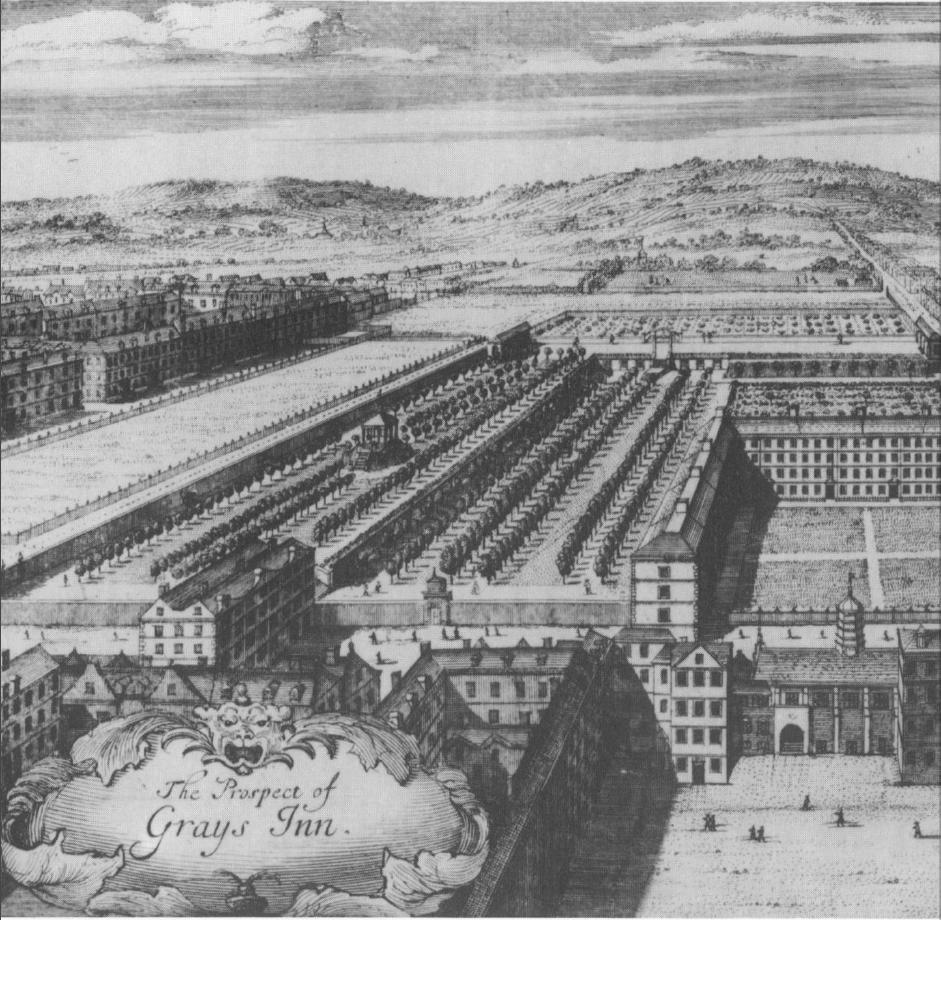
An image from 1702 showing the Walks

The Walks are the gardens within Gray's Inn, and have existed since at least 1597, when records show that Francis Bacon was to be paid £7 for "planting of trees in the walkes". Prior to this the area (known as Green Court) was used as a place to dump waste and rubble, since at the time the Inn was open to any Londoner. In 1587 four Benchers were ordered by the Pension to "consider what charge a brick wall in the fields will draw unto And where the said wall shalbe fittest to be builded", and work on such a wall was completed in 1598, which helped keep out the citizens of London.

In 1599 additional trees were planted in the Walks, and stairs up to the Walks were also added. When Francis Bacon became treasurer in 1608 more improvements were made, since he no longer had to seek the approval of the Pension to make changes. In September 1608 a gate was installed on the southern wall, and various gardeners were employed to maintain the Walks. The gardens became commonly used as a place of relaxation, and James Howell wrote in 1621 that "I hold [Gray's Inn Walks] to be the pleasantest place about London, and that there you have the choicest society".

The Walks were well-maintained during the reign of William III, although the Inn's lack of prosperity made more improvements impossible. In 1711 the gardener was ordered not to admit "any women or children into the Walkes", and in 1718 was given permission to physically remove those he found. At the end of the 18th century Charles Lamb said that the Walks were "the best gardens of any of the Inns of Court, their aspect being altogether reverend and law-abiding". In 1720 the old gate was replaced by "a pair of handsome iron gates with peers and other proper imbellishments". The 19th and 20th centuries saw few major changes, apart from the introduction of plane trees into the Walks.

The Walks are listed Grade II*on the Register of Historic Parks and Gardens.

=== Library ===
The Library of Gray's Inn has existed since at least 1555, when the first mention of it was made in the will of Robert Chaloner, who left some money to buy law books for the Library. The Library was neither a big collection nor a dedicated one; in 1568 it was being housed in a single room in the chambers of Nicholas Bacon, a room that was also used for mooting and to store the deed chest. The collection grew larger over the years as individual Benchers such as Sir John Finch and Sir John Bankes left books or money to buy books in their wills, and the first Librarian was appointed in 1646 after members of the Inn had been found stealing books.

In 1669 books were bought by the Inn as an organisation for the first time, and a proper catalogue was drawn up to prevent theft. In 1684 a fire that broke out in Coney Court, where the Library was situated, and destroyed much of the collection. While some books were saved, most of the records prior to 1684 were lost. A "handsome room" was then built to house the Library.

The Library became more important during the 18th century; prior to that it had been a small, little-used collection of books. In 1725 it was proposed by the Pension that "a publick Library be sett up and kept open for ye use of ye society", and that more books be purchased. The first order of new books was on 27 June 1729 and consisted of "a collection of Lord Bacon's works". In 1750 the Under-Steward of the Inn made a new catalogue of the books, and in 1789 the Library was moved to a new room between the Hall and the chapel. In 1840 another two rooms were erected in which to store books, and in 1883 a new Library was constructed with space to store approximately 11,000 books. This was rapidly found to be inadequate, and in 1929 a new Library, known as the Holker Library after the benefactor, Sir John Holker, was opened. The library, although impressive looking, was not particularly useful. Francis Cowper wrote that:

Though impressive to look at, the new building was something less than a success as a library. The air of spaciousness was produced at the expense of shelf room, and though in the octagon [at the north end] the decorative effect of row upon row of books soaring upwards towards the cornice was considerable, the loftiest were totally inaccessible save to those who could scale the longest and dizziest ladders. Further, the appointments were of such surpassing magnificence that no ink-pots were allowed in the room for fear of accidents.

The building did not last very long—damage to the Inn during the Blitz completely destroyed the Library and a large part of its collection, although the rare manuscripts, which had been moved elsewhere, survived. After the destruction of much of the Inn's collection, George VI donated replacements for many lost texts. A prefabricated building in the Walks was used to hold the surviving books while a new Library was constructed, and the new building (designed by Sir Edward Maufe) was opened in 1958. It is similar in size to the old Holker Library, but is more workmanlike and designed to allow for easy access to the books.

== Notable members ==
Having existed for over 600 years, Gray's Inn has a long list of notable members and honorary members. Names of many members can be found in the List of members of Gray's Inn. Even as the smallest of the Inns of Court it has had members who have been particularly noted lawyers and judges, such as Thomas Cromwell, Francis Bacon, The 1st Earl of Birkenhead, Baron Slynn, Lord Bingham of Cornhill, Lord Hoffmann and Baroness Hale of Richmond, the first female Justice of the Supreme Court. Outside the Bar and judiciary of England and Wales, members have included the clergy (including five Archbishops of Canterbury), industrialists like John Wynne, astronomers such as John Lee, media figures, like Huw Thomas, and members of the Bar, judiciary and Government of other nations, such as Sir Ti-liang Yang (former Chief Justice of the Supreme Court of Hong Kong), B. R. Ambedkar (principal architect of the Constitution of India), Leslie Goonewardene (founder of Sri Lanka's first political party, the Lanka Sama Samaja Party), former presidents of Cyprus Spyros Kyprianou, Tassos Papadopoulos, and Glafcos Clerides, and Prime Minister-designate of Trinidad and Tobago Stuart Young.

== Bibliography ==
- Aikenhead, Ian D. (1977). "Students of the Common Law 1590–1615: Lives and Ideas at the Inns of Court". The University of Toronto Law Journal. 27 (3): 243–256. doi:10.2307/825568. ISSN 0042-0220. JSTOR 825568.
- Campbell, John (1983). F.E Smith, First Earl of Birkenhead (1st ed.). Jonathan Cape. ISBN 0-7126-5117-9.
- Charlton, Kenneth (1960). "Liberal Education and the Inns of Court in the Sixteenth Century". British Journal of Educational Studies. 9 (1). Blackwell: 25–38. doi:10.1080/00071005.1960.9973044. ISSN 0007-1005.
- Douthwaite, William Ralph (1886). Gray's Inn, Its History & Associations. Reeves and Turner. OCLC 2578698.
- Fletcher, Reginald (1901). The Pension book of Gray's Inn (records of the honourable society) 1569–1669. Vol. I. Chiswick Press. OCLC 59205885.
- Fletcher, Reginald (1910). The Pension book of Gray's Inn (records of the honourable society) 1669–1800. Vol. II. Chiswick Press. OCLC 49724200.
- Foster, Joseph (1889). Register of admissions to Gray's Inn, 1521–1889 together with the register of marriages in Gray's Inn Chapel, 1695–1754. Hansard Publishing Union. OCLC 271771277.
- Holdsworth, William (1921). "The Disappearance of the Educational System of the Inns of Court". University of Pennsylvania Law Review and American Law Register. 69 (3). University of Pennsylvania: 201–222. doi:10.2307/3314249. ISSN 0749-9833. JSTOR 3314249.
- Ireland, Samuel (1800). Picturesque views, with an historical account of the inns of court, in London and Westminster. R. Faulder. OCLC 60718600.
- Jacques, David (1989). "'The Chief Ornament' of Gray's Inn: The Walks from Bacon to Brown". Garden History. 17 (1). The Garden History Society: 41–67. doi:10.2307/1586915. ISSN 0307-1243. JSTOR 1586915.
- Keay, Frances Anne (1926). "Student Days at the Inns of Court". University of Pennsylvania Law Review and American Law Register. 75 (1). University of Pennsylvania: 50–60. doi:10.2307/3307905. ISSN 0749-9833. JSTOR 3307905.
- Lemmings, David (1990). Gentlemen and barristers: the Inns of Court and the English bar, 1680–1730. Oxford University Press. ISBN 0-19-822155-X.
- Loftie, W J (1895). The Inns of Court and Chancery. New York: Macmillan & Co. OCLC 592845.
- Maun, Ian (2009). From Commons to Lord's, Volume One: 1700 to 1750. Roger Heavens. ISBN 978-1-900592-52-9.
- Pearce, Robert Richard (1848). History of the Inns of Court and Chancery: With Notices of Their Ancient Discipline, Rules, Orders, and Customs, Readings, Moots, Masques, Revels, and Entertainments. R. Bentley. OCLC 16803021.
- Pulleyn, William (1830). The etymological compendium; or, Portfolio of origins and inventions (2nd ed.). T. Tegg. OCLC 221125101.
- Ringrose, Hyacinthe (1909). The Inns of Court: an historical description of the Inns of court and chancery of England. Oxford: R.L. Williams. OCLC 80561477.
- Ruda, Richard (2008). A Visitor's Guide to the four Inns of Court in Central London. Washington D.C.: American Inns of Court.
- Spilsbury, William (1850). Lincoln's inn; its ancient and modern buildings: with an account of the library. W. Pickering. OCLC 316910934.
- Stanford, Edward (1860). Stanford's new London guide. Stanford Edward, ltd. OCLC 60205994.
- Steel, H. Spenden (1907). "Origin and History of English Inns of Chancery". The Virginia Law Register. 13 (8). Virginia Law Review: 585–593. doi:10.2307/1103274. ISSN 1547-1357. JSTOR 1103274.
- Simpson, A.W.B. (1975). "The Early Constitution of Gray's Inn". Cambridge Law Journal. 34 (1). Cambridge University Press: 131–150. doi:10.1017/S0008197300092102. ISSN 0008-1973. S2CID 145163239.
- Waghorn, H. T. (1899). Cricket Scores, Notes, etc. (1730–1773). Blackwood.
- Wilson, Martin (2005). An Index to Waghorn. Bodyline.
- Watt, Francis; Dunbar Plunket Barton; Charles Benham (1928). The Story of the Inns of Court. Boston: Houghton Mifflin. OCLC 77565485.
- Williams, E. (1906). Staple Inn, Customs House, Wool Court and Inn of Chancery; Its Mediaeval Surroundings and Associations. London.
