= Edward Stanhope (disambiguation) =

Edward Stanhope (1840–1893) was a British politician.

Edward Stanhope may also refer to:

- Edward Stanhope (died 1603), MP for Nottinghamshire (UK Parliament constituency) and Yorkshire
- Edward Stanhope (died 1608), MP for Marlborough
- Edward Stanhope (died 1646), MP for Scarborough (UK Parliament constituency)

== See also ==
- Edward Scudamore-Stanhope, 12th Earl of Chesterfield, English nobleman
