= State House, Seychelles =

Official residence of the President of the Seychelles

State House
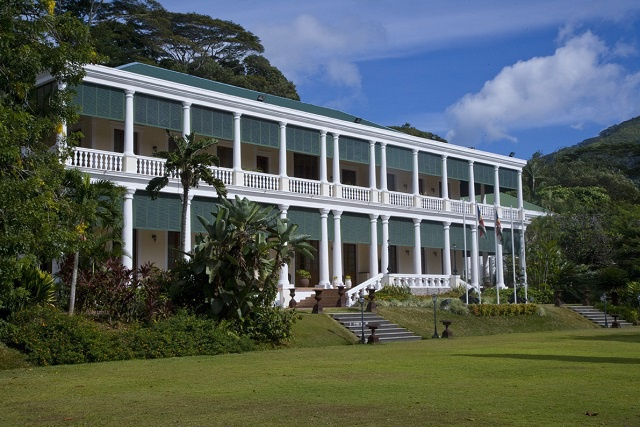
- Interactive map of the State House area
- Former names: Government House

General information
- Type: official residence
- Location: Victoria, Mahé, Seychelles
- Coordinates: 4.6244°S 55.4512°E
- Current tenants: President of the Seychelles
- Inaugurated: 1910
- Owner: Government of the Seychelles

Design and construction
- Architect: William Marshall Vaudin

Website
- http://www.statehouse.gov.sc

The State House is the official residence of the President of the Seychelles.

== History ==
The State House was designed and built in 1910, when Seychelles was still a British colony. Then known as "Government House", it was the residence of the Governors of the Seychelles, beginning with Sir Walter Davidson in 1912. Typical of the colonial architecture aesthetic of the time and place, it features a two-story portico ornamented with white pillars. The architect was William Marshall Vaudin, who was born in Seychelles in 1866. The building was renovated in 1976, immediately before Seychelles became an independent republic in the Commonwealth of Nations, and again in 2007.

State House remains as the official residence of the President of the Seychelles. The building is used as the office of the President, and in theory can be used as the President's residential home (though former President Danny Faure did not live at State House). The building is used for diplomatic functions and state investitures, and has been classified as a national monument.
