= Supreme Court of Seychelles =

Highest trial court in Seychelles

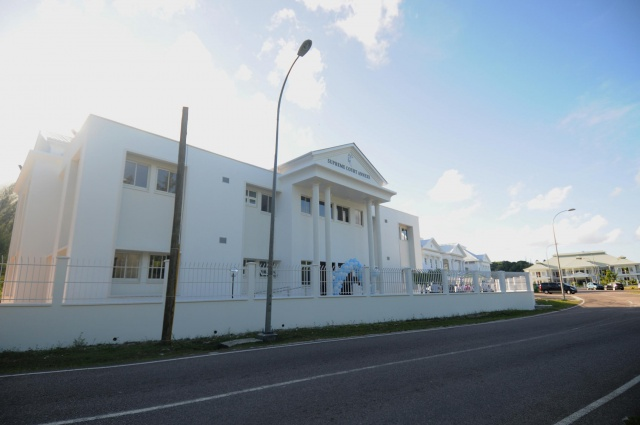
The Supreme Court Annexe of the Seychelles Palais de Justice

The Supreme Court of Seychelles (French: Cour suprême des Seychelles, Seselwa Creole French: Kou Siprèm Sesel) is the highest trial court in Seychelles.

It was created in 1903 by Order in Council, when it consisted of one judge who was the chief justice of the court. Appeal cases with final judgments of the court in civil matters were transferred to the Supreme Court of Mauritius.

There was a right of appeal to the Judicial Committee of the Privy Council in London – which was abolished upon independence.

When Seychelles became a republic in 1976, a new Court of Appeal of Seychelles was constituted which consisted of a president, two justices of appeal and the judges of the Supreme Court as ex-officio members. Appeals to the Court of Civil Appeal of Mauritius and the Judicial Committee of the Privy Council were abolished.

In 1993, under the new constitution, the judicial power of Seychelles is vested in the Supreme Court, a Court of Appeal, and such subordinate courts or tribunals that may be established by the legislature. The attorney-general and the judges of the Supreme Court are appointed by the president from a list of candidates prepared by the Constitutional Appointments Authority. The head of the Supreme Court, who is also the head of the Judiciary, is entitled the chief justice. The other judges of the Supreme Court are referred to as puisne judges.

== Chief Justices of the Crown Colony ==
Incumbent	Tenure		Notes
Incumbent	Took office	Left office	Notes
Fury Alfred Herchenroder	1903	1905	(later Chief Justice of Mauritius, 1913)
Eric Blackwood Wright	1905	1909	
Alfred Karney Young	1909	1913	(afterwards Attorney General of Fiji, 1913)
Sir Ewen Reginald Logan	1914	1919	(afterwards Chief Justice of the Bahamas, 1925)
Sir Philip Bertie Petrides	1920	1924	(later Chief Justice of the Gold Coast, 1936)
Sir Justin Louis Devaux	1924	1927	(later Chief Justice of Mauritius, 1940)
Robert Vere de Vere	1927	1931	(afterwards Chief Justice of Grenada, 1931)
Patrick Joseph Stanislaus Walsh	1931	1936	
John Woodman OBE	1943	1947	
Malcolm Douglas Lyon	1948	1957	
Sir France Bonnetard	1958	1966	
Sir William Campbell Wylie	1966	1970	
Sir Georges Souyave	1970	?1976	

== Chief Justices of the Republic ==
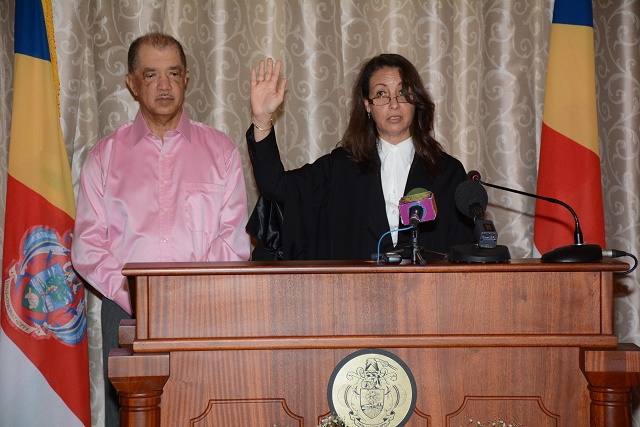
Swearing in of Mathilda Twomey as Chief Justice

Incumbent	Tenure		Notes
Incumbent	Took office	Left office	Notes
James Aiden O'Brien Quinn	1976	1977	(Expelled; afterwards Chief Justice of Kiribati, 1977–1980; Botswana, 1981–1987)
Earle Edward Seaton	1978	1989	
Isaac Kobina Donkor Abban	1990	1993	(afterwards Chief Justice of Ghana,1995)
Vivekanand Alleear	1994	2009	
Andrew Ranjan Perera	2009		
Martin Stephen Egonda-Ntende	2009	2014	Durai Karunakaran served as acting chief justice from 2014 to 2015.
Mathilda Twomey	2015	2020	
Rony Goviden	2020		

=== Current composition ===
- Rony Govinden – Chief Justice
- Mohan Burhan
- Gustave Dodin
- Melchior Vidot
- Laura Pillay
- Ellen Carolus
- Brassel Adeline
- Natasha Burian
- David Esparon
- Alexandra Madeleine
