= List of first women lawyers and judges in Oceania =

This is a list of the first women lawyer(s) and judge(s) in Australia and Oceania. It includes the year in which the women were admitted to practice law (in parentheses). Also included are the first women in their country to achieve a certain distinction such as obtaining a law degree.

KEY

- FRA = Administrative division of France
- GBR = British overseas territory of the United Kingdom
- USA = Associate state or territory of the United States of America

== Australia ==
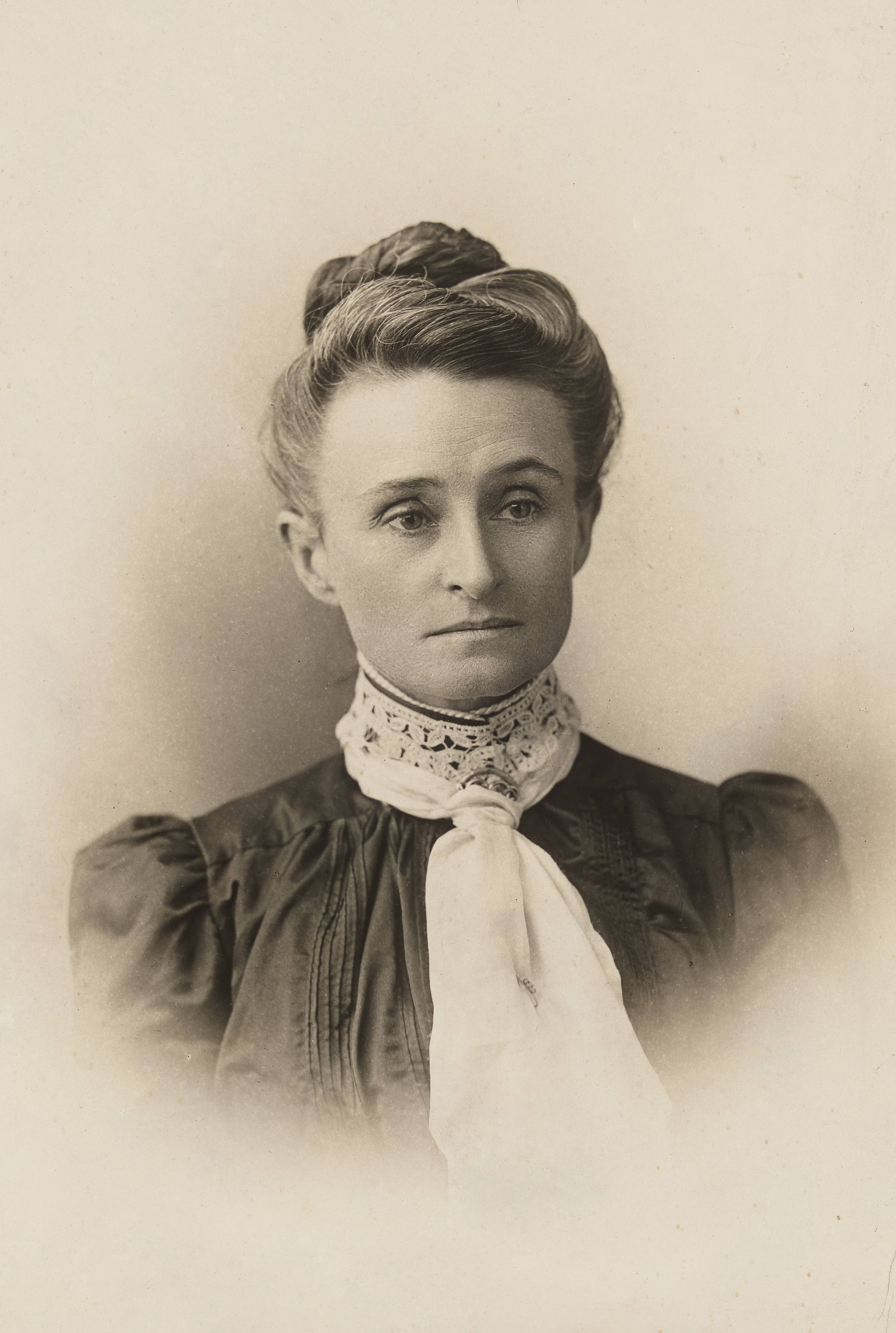
Edith Cowan: First female magistrate in Australia (1920)

- Ada Evans: First female law graduate in Australia (1902)
- Flos Greig (1905): First female solicitor in Australia
- Edith Cowan: First female magistrate in Australia (1920)
- Elizabeth Evatt (1956): First female appointed as a Judge of the Family Court of Australia and serve as its Chief Justice (1976)
- Nerolie Phyllis Withnall: First female to serve as the president of a law society in Australia (1979)
- Mahla Pearlman (1960): First female appointed as a Chief Judge of any jurisdiction in Australia (1992)
- Roma Mitchell (1962): First female judge in Australia (1965). She was also the first female Queen's Counsel (QC) in Australia (1962).
- Mary Gaudron (1968): First female appointed as a Justice of the High Court of Australia (1987), as well as the first female Solicitor-General in Australia (1981)
- Diana Bryant (1970): First female appointed as the Chief Federal Magistrate of Australia (2000)
- Deirdre O'Connor (1974): First female appointed as a Judge of the Federal Court of Australia (1990), to the Administrative Appeals Tribunal (1990), Australian Industrial Relations Commission (1994)
- Marilyn Warren (1975): First female justice appointed as a Chief Justice in Australia (2003)
- Susan Kiefel (1975): First female justice appointed as the Chief Justice of the High Court of Australia (2016)
- Pat O'Shane (1976): First Aboriginal (female) to earn a law degree and become a barrister and magistrate (c. 1986) in Australia
- Margaret McMurdo (1976): First female to serve as the president of an appellate court in Australia (1998)
- Catherine Branson (c. 1977): First female to become a Crown Solicitor in Australia (1984)
- Norah Hartnett, Christine Mead, Judy Ryan: First females appointed as Federal Magistrates for what is now the Federal Circuit Court of Australia (2000)
- Louise Taylor: First indigenous female (Kamilaroi) to serve as a supreme court justice in Australia (2023)

=== Norfolk Island ===
- Susan Kiefel (Queensland Bar, 1975): First female appointed as a Justice of the Norfolk Island Supreme Court (2004)
- Piria Coleman: First Norfolk Island woman to practice law in Norfolk Island (2012)

== Federated States of Micronesia ==
- Janet Healy Weeks: First female lawyer and judge (1982) in Micronesia
- Beauleen Carl-Worswick (1992): First Micronesian female lawyer, as well as the first female Justice (2010) and Acting Chief Justice (2021) of the Supreme Court of the Federated States of Micronesia
- Marstella Jack: First female appointed as an Attorney General in the Federated States of Micronesia (2005)
- Katherine Maraman: First female to serve as the Chief Justice in Guam and across Micronesia (2017)

== Fiji ==
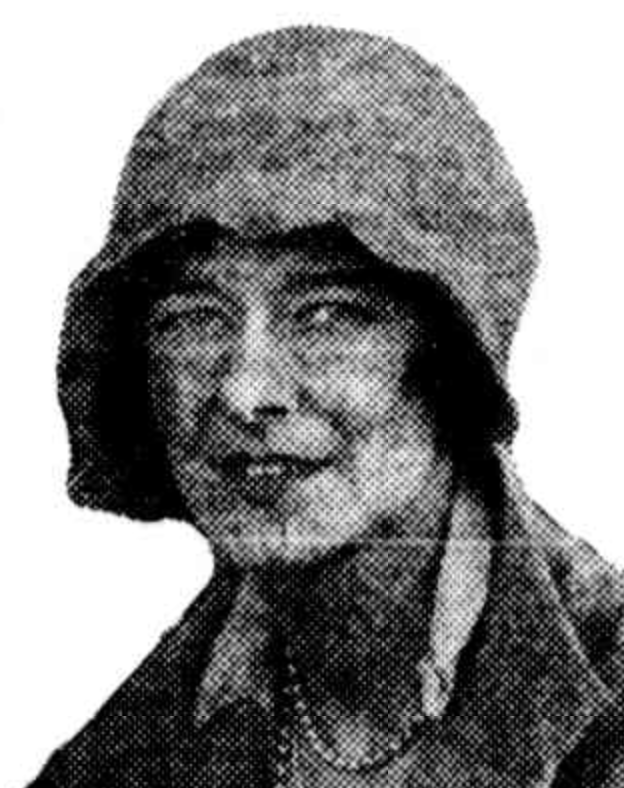
Patricia Hackett: First female lawyer to take out a practising lawyer's certificate in Fiji (c. 1930)

- Patricia Hackett (1936): First female lawyer to take out a practicing lawyer's certificate in Fiji
- Mere Pulea: First Fijian female to earn a law degree. She was later appointed as a Judge of the High Court of Fiji.
- ‘Iunaise Vusenga Helu-Mocelutu: First female (of Tongan descent) magistrate in Fiji (1986)
- Nazhat Shameem (1983): First female judge (who is of Indo-Fijian descent) in Fiji (upon her appointment as a Judge of the High Court of Fiji in 1999). She was also the first woman to serve as a prosecutor (1984) and act as the Director of Fiji's Department of Public Prosecutions (1994). In 2008, Shameem and Jocelynne Scutt became the first females to sit on the Court of Appeal of Fiji.
- Laurel Vaurasi: First female to serve as the President of the Fiji Law Society (2016)
- Anjala Wati: First female to serve as a Justice of the Supreme Court of Fiji (2016)
- Ana Tuiketei: First Fijian female elected to the International Criminal Court in The Hague, Netherlands (2020)

== French Polynesia (FRA) ==
- Denise Goupil (1961): First female lawyer in French Polynesia. In 1977, she became the first female to serve as the Bâtonnier of the Papeete Bar Association.
- Marie-France Luneau: First female juvenile court judge in French Polynesia (upon her appointment to the Papeete Court of First Instance in 1984)
- Andrée Conre: First female to serve as the First President of the Court of Appeal of French Polynesia (Papeete) (1994)
- Solène Belaouar: First female public prosecutor in French Polynesia (2023)

== Kiribati ==
- Dame Roma Mitchell: First female Justice of the Kiribati Court of Appeal (1987)
- Pole Atanraoi-Reim (1992): First female lawyer in Kiribati
- Bernadette Eberi: First female to serve as the President of the Kiribati Law Society (c. 2013)
- Tetiro Semilota: First female Attorney-General of Kiribati (2016). She became the first i-Kiribati (female) to serve as the acting (2022) and permanent (around 2024) Chief Justice of Kiribati.
- Tekatau Bio (2021): First i-Kiribati (female) admitted as a barrister and solicitor to the High Court of New Zealand

== Marshall Islands ==
- Rosalie Konou (1983): First female lawyer in the Marshall Islands
- Grace Lokboj-Leban: First female appointed as a full-time Judge of the Traditional Rights Court in Marshall Islands (2010) and serve as its Chief Judge (2020)
- Vanessa Tzoannos: First Greek (female) lawyer qualified to practice law in the Marshall Islands (2019)
- Claire Therese Loeak: First (female) legally trained Associate Justice of the Traditional Rights Court of the Marshall Islands (2021)
- Ingrid Kabua: First female to serve a Judge of the District Court of the Marshall Islands (2025)

== Nauru ==
- Barina Waqa: First female lawyer in Nauru. In 2023, she became the first female President of the Nauru Law Society.
- ‘Iunaise Vusenga Helu-Mocelutu: First female appointed as the Resident Magistrate in Nauru (1990)
- Jane Hamilton-White (1998): First female judge in Nauru (upon her appointment as a Justice of the Supreme Court of Nauru in 2014)
- Shirani Bandaranayake: First female to serve as a Justice of the Nauru Court of Appeal (upon her appointment as the Acting President in 2022)

== New Caledonia (FRA) ==
- Solange Drollet (1971): First female lawyer to open a law office in New Caledonia (1974)
- Thérèse Pelletier (1977): First female admitted to practice law in New Caledonia per the Nouméa Bar Association's records
- Renée Reuter: First female to serve as the President of the Bar of Nouméa (Bâtonnier au Barreau de Nouméa)
- Augusta Filippi: First female to serve as the President of the Nouméa Court of Appeal (1979) [jurisdiction over New Caledonia and Wallis and Futuna]
- Lisa Kibangui: First (female) mixed-race Caledonian to become a magistrate. She was also the first native Caledonian female registered with the Noumea Bar.
- Annie Brunet-Fuster: First female to serve as an Attorney General in New Caledonia (upon becoming the Attorney General of the Nouméa Court of Appeal; her service ended in 2015)
- Nadine Pidjot (2017): First Kanak female lawyer in New Caledonia (upon being called to the Bar of Nouméa)
- Estelle Sitrita-Streeter: First Kanak female judicial commissioner (bailiff) in New Caledonia (2020)
- Océane Uhila-Trolue: First Kanak female judge in New Caledonia (upon her appointment to the Court of Appeal in 2024)

== New Zealand ==
- Ethel Benjamin (1897): First female barrister and solicitor in New Zealand (and in the British Empire)
- Harriette Vine (1915): First woman to graduate with a degree in law from Victoria University of Wellington
- Augusta Wallace (1954): First female judge in New Zealand (1975)
- Shirley Smith (1957): First woman to be a full member of a law faculty at a New Zealand university (at Victoria University of Wellington)
- Una Jagose (1960): First female to serve as the Solicitor-General of New Zealand (2016)
- Silvia Cartwright (1967): First female appointed as a Judge of the Chief District Court (1989) and Judge of the High Court (1993)
- Sian Elias (1970): First female justice appointed as the Chief Justice of New Zealand (1999) and one of the first female Queen's Counsel (alongside Lowell Goddard) in New Zealand
- Georgina te Heuheu (1971): First Māori female lawyer in New Zealand
- Judith Potter: First female to serve as the President of the New Zealand Law Society (1990)
- Lowell Goddard (1975): First Māori female appointed as a Judge of the High Court in New Zealand (1995)
- Mele Tuilotolava (1982): First Pacific Islander female lawyer in New Zealand
- Margaret Wilson: First female lawyer to become the Attorney-General of New Zealand (1999-2005)
- Caren Fox: First Māori female appointed as a Judge of the Māori Land Court (2000) and Deputy Chief Judge (2010) in New Zealand
- Denise Clark (1985): First Māori female appointed as a Judge of the District Court in New Zealand (2001)
- Moana Schwalger: First Pacific Islander (female) appointed as a Senior Crown Prosecutor by the Solicitor-General of New Zealand
- Tiana Epati: First (female) lawyer of Pacific descent elected as President of the New Zealand Law Society (2018). In 2025, Epati became the first Samoan (female) appointed as a King’s Counsel in New Zealand.
- Maria Dew: First female to serve as the President of the New Zealand Bar Association (2021)
- Tania Sharkey: First Tongan (female) appointed as a Judge of the District Court (family jurisdiction) in New Zealand (2023)
- Merepaia King: First Māori (female) to serve as a Judge of the Employment Court of New Zealand (2023)
- Ali'imuamua Sandra Alofivae: First Samoan (female) appointed as a Judge of the District Court in New Zealand (2024)

=== Cook Islands ===
- Tina Pupuke Browne (1981): First female registered (before the High Court) as a practicing lawyer in the Cook Islands
- Janet Maki: First female Solicitor General in the Cook Islands (c. 1998), as well as the first female Ombudsman in the Cook Islands (c. 2006)
- Christine Grice: First female judge in the Cook Islands (upon serving on the High Court of the Cook Islands in 2007)
- Noeline Browne: First Cook Islander (female) to earn a law degree within Cook Islands (2020)

=== Niue ===
- Peleni Talagi (c. 1996): First Niuean female admitted to the New Zealand Bar
- Sarah Reeves (1985): First female appointed as a Judge of the High Court of Niue (2014)

=== Tokelau ===
- Sian Elias (1970): First female justice appointed as the Chief Justice of Tokelau (1999) (Tokelau)
- Lise Hope Suveinakama: First Tokelau (female) admitted as a barrister and solicitor before the High Court of New Zealand (Waikato) (c. 2000)

== Palau ==
- Ernestine Rengiil (1987): First Palauan female lawyer in Palau. She is also known as the first Palauan female to serve as the Attorney General of Palau (1992).
- Janet Healy Weeks: First female to serve as a part-time associate judge in Palau (1993)
- Jerrlyn Uduch Sengebau Senior: First female judge in Palau (upon her appointment as an Associate Judge of the Land Court in 1999)
- Kathleen M. Salii: First female appointed as an Associate Justice of the Palau Supreme Court (2000). In 2020, Salii became the first female to serve as the Presiding Justice of the Trial Division of the Palau Supreme Court.
- Lourdes F. Materne: First female appointed as a Senior Judge of the Palau Court of Common Pleas (2003)
- Lalii Chin Sakuma: First Palauan (female) appointed as the Chief Public Defender of Palau (2012)

== Papua New Guinea ==
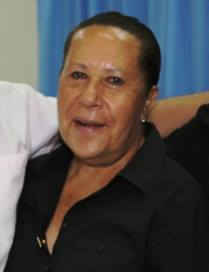
Meg Taylor: First female lawyer in Papua New Guinea

- Hilda Maddocks (1948): First woman to practice as a barrister and solicitor for the Supreme Court of Papua New Guinea
- Meg Taylor (1976): First female to earn a law degree and become a lawyer in Papua New Guinea
- Teresa Doherty: First female to serve as a Councillor of the PNG Law Society and judge in Papua New Guinea (upon her appointment on an acting basis to the Supreme Court of Papua New Guinea in 1988). She is considered the first female judge in the South Pacific.
- Catherine Davani (1984): First native female to serve as a Justice of the Supreme Court of Papua New Guinea (2001)
- Nerrie Eliakim: First female appointed as a Chief Magistrate in Papua New Guinea (2013)
- Helen Roalakona: First female to serve as the Acting Public Prosecutor of Papua New Guinea (2025)

== Pitcairn Islands (GBR) ==
See Women in law in the United Kingdom

== Samoa ==
- Olive Nelson (1936): First female barrister and solicitor in Samoa. She was also the first Samoan female to earn a law degree (1936).
- Brenda Heather-Latu (New Zealand, 1987): First female appointed as the Attorney General of Samoa (1997)
- Faimaala Filipo: First female judge of the specialist Land and Titles Court of Samoa
- Fa'amausili Tuilimu Solo Brown: First female to serve as the Vice-President of the specialist Land and Titles Court of Samoa (2008)
- Mata Keli Tuatagaloa: First native female judge in Samoa (upon her appointment as a Judge of the District Court of Samoa in 2011). She later became the first female Justice of the Supreme Court of Samoa (2015).
- Mareva Betham-Annandale: First female elected as the President of the Samoa Law Society (c. 2014)
- Tafaoimalo Leilani Tuala-Warren: First (female) Judge of the Family Court and Family Violence Court of Samoa (2013)
- Luamanuvao Katalaina Sapolu: First female to serve as the Ombudsman of Samoa (2021)

== Solomon Islands ==
- Patricia Hackett: First female solicitor in the Solomon Islands (c. 1936)
- Jean Gordon, Nuatali Tongarutu, and Maelyn Bird: First female lawyers in the Solomon Islands (c. 1980s). Tongarutu became the first female to serve as the Acting Attorney General of the Solomon Islands (2006-2007), and Bird went on to become the first native female to serve as a Judge of the High Court of Solomon Islands (2019).
- Ester Lelapitu: First female appointed as a magistrate in the Solomon Islands (1999)
- Jane Hamilton-White: First female appointed as the Principal Magistrate of the Solomon Islands (c. 2003–2005)
- Nkemdilim Izuako: First female judge in the Solomon Islands (upon her appointment to the High Court of Solomon Islands in 2006)
- Emma Garo: First female appointed as a Principal Magistrate in the Central Magistrates Court (2007) and the Chief Magistrate of the Solomon Islands (2017). Garo is also known as one of the first qualified female lawyers in the Solomon Islands.
- Katalaini Ziru: First female elected as the President of the Solomon Islands Bar Association (2014)
- Margaret Wilson: First female to serve as a Judge of the Solomon Islands Court of Appeal (2014)
- Rachel Subusola Olutimayin: First female to serve as Solomon Islands' Director of Public Prosecutions (2019)

== Tonga ==
- ʻAna Kata Nau: First female lawyer in Tonga
- ‘Iunaise Vusenga Helu-Mocelutu: First female magistrate in Tonga (upon becoming a police magistrate of the Magistrates' Courts in 1994)
- 'Alisi Afeaki Taumoepeau: First female appointed as the Solicitor General of Tonga (2004), Attorney General of Tonga (2006-2009), and Acting Ombudsman of Tonga (2023)
- Linda Folaumoetu'i: First female Law Lord in Tonga (2017). She is also the female to serve as the Attorney General of Tonga without also being the Minister of Justice (2019).
- 'Elisapeti Langi and Petunia Tupou: First female (acting and permanent, respectively) Justices of the Supreme Court of Tonga (2020/2022). In 2023, Langi became the first Tongan (female) to be admitted as Counsel of the International Criminal Court.
- 'Alisi Afeaki Taumoepeau, Petunia Tupou, and Dana Stephenson: First females appointed as King's Counsel in Tonga (2020-2021)
- Loupua Pahulu-Kuli: First female to serve as the Chief Magistrate of the Magistrates' Courts of Tonga (2025)

== Tuvalu ==
- Eselealofa "Ese" Apinelu (1998): First Tuvaluan female lawyer, as well as the first female Attorney General of Tuvalu (2008- )
- Joelle Grover: First female (an Australian) appointed as The People's Lawyer in Tuvalu (2007-2009) (Tuvalu)
- Judith Potter: First female to serve as a Judge of the Court of Appeal of Tuvalu (2014)
- Filiga Taukiei Niko: First Tuvaluan female appointed as The People's Lawyer in Tuvalu (2015- )

According to Kofe and Taomia (2007), women have served as Island Court magistrates in Tuvalu though their names were not identified. In 1998, the United Nations Development Fund for Women (Pacific Office) offered the following data:

- Kanakope Peniata: First female local magistrate in Tuvalu
- Helani Kaitu: First female residential magistrate in Tuvalu

== Vanuatu ==
- Heather Lini-Leo Matas: First indigenous female lawyer in Vanuatu
- Rita Naviti: First female magistrate in Vanuatu (1993). She was also the first female to serve as the Chief Registrar of the Supreme Court of Vanuatu.
- Marie-Noelle Ferrieux Patterson: First (female) Ombudsman for Vanuatu (1996)
- Kayleen Tavoa: First female Public Prosecutor in Vanuatu (2005-2014)
- Mary Sey: First female judge in Vanuatu (upon serving on the Supreme Court of Vanuatu from 2012 to 2017)
- Viran Molisa Trief: First female Solicitor General of Vanuatu (2009-2016) and first Ni-Vanuatu woman appointed to the Supreme Court of Vanuatu (2019)
- Jane Tari: First female to serve as the second highest official at the Public Solicitor’s Office in Vanuatu. In 2026, Tari became the first female Public Solicitor of Vanuatu.
- Angelyne Glenda Dovo Roy: First female Attorney General of Vanuatu (2025)

== See also ==
- Justice ministry
- List of first women lawyers and judges by nationality
- List of first women lawyers and judges in Africa
- List of first women lawyers and judges in Asia
- List of first women lawyers and judges in Europe
- List of first women lawyers and judges in North America
- List of first women lawyers and judges in South America
- List of first women lawyers and judges in the United States
- List of the first women appointed to Australian judicial positions
- List of the first women holders of political offices in Oceania
