= LGBTQ rights in Tuvalu =

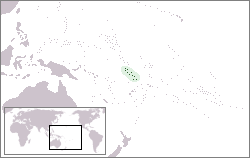
- Tuvalu
- Legal status: Male illegal, female legal
- Penalty: Up to 14 years' imprisonment (not enforced, legalisation proposed)
- Gender identity: No
- Military: Has no military
- Discrimination protections: Protections in employment; sexual orientation only (see below)

Family rights
- Recognition of relationships: No
- Restrictions: Same-sex marriage constitutionally banned since 2023
- Adoption: No

Lesbian, gay, bisexual, transgender and queer (LGBTQ) people in Tuvalu face legal difficulties not experienced by non-LGBTQ residents. Sections 153, 154 and 155 of the Penal Code outlaw male homosexual intercourse with a penalty of up to 14 years in prison, but the law is not enforced. Employment discrimination on the basis of sexual orientation has been banned since 2017. Since 2023, the Constitution of Tuvalu has banned same-sex marriage.

Tuvalu is home to a traditional transgender population, called the pinapinaaine, or pina, who historically played certain societal and communal roles.

In 2011, Tuvalu signed the "joint statement on ending acts of violence and related human rights violations based on sexual orientation and gender identity" at the United Nations, condemning violence and discrimination against LGBTQ people.

== History ==
Prejudices towards same-sex relationships and transgender people are not documented before the arrival of Christian missionaries in the late 19th and early 20th century. In the pre-colonial era Polynesia societies, such as Samoa, were a very "sexually free" cultures.

In Tuvalu, people who are assigned male at birth but live and behave as women are called pinapinaaine, or pina, and historically had certain societal roles, such as basket weaving. They were also known for their talent to elaborate dance ceremonies. The Tuvalu Pina Association was established in 2015. The role of the organisation is to advocate for the rights of pina. The association has 15 members, who are members of two informal pina groups.

== Constitution of Tuvalu ==
The 2023 amendments to the Constitution do not provide for the recognition of LGBTQ rights in Tuvalu. The freedom from discrimination in section 27, describes discrimination as referring to the treatment of different people in different ways wholly or mainly because of their different sex (among other protected attributes), and does not refer freedom from discrimination in respect to sexual orientation.

The 2023 amendments to the Constitution also set out the Charter of Duties and Responsibilities. However, the only statement as to relationships is to “a family unit, which shall comprise a marriage as between a man and a woman to the exclusion of all others”, in Section 43(2)(b).

== Legality of same-sex sexual activity ==
The Penal Code prohibits male homosexual and heterosexual anal intercourse. According to the United States Department of State, as of 2013 there were no reports of prosecution of consenting adults under these provisions. The age of consent for heterosexual vaginal sex and lesbian sex is 15.

=== Penal Code ===
- Section 153: Unnatural offences

Any person who — (a) commits buggery with another person or with an animal; or (b) permits a male person to commit buggery with him or her, shall be guilty of a felony, and shall be liable to imprisonment for 14 years.

- Section 154: Attempts to commit unnatural offences and indecent assault

Any person who attempts to commit any of the offences specified in the last preceding section, or who is guilty of any assault with intent to commit the same, or any indecent assault upon any male person shall be guilty of a felony, and shall be liable to imprisonment for 7 years.

- Section 155: Indecent practices between males

Any male person who, whether in public or private, commits any act of gross indecency with another male person, or procures another male person to commit any act of gross indecency with him, or attempts to procure the commission of any such act by any male person with himself or with another male person, whether in public or private, shall be guilty of a felony, and shall be liable to imprisonment for 5 years.

== Recognition of same-sex relationships ==
Tuvalu does not recognize same-sex marriage or civil unions. The Marriage Act (Cap 29) (Tuvaluan: Tulafono Lasi i te Faiga o Avaga (Napa 29)) does not expressly prohibit the recognition of same-sex unions, but generally assumes the parties to be male and female. Same-sex marriages do not appear in the Act's "restrictions on marriage" section.

== Discrimination protections ==
The Labour and Employment Relations Act 2017 bans discrimination based on sexual orientation. Workplace discrimination on the basis of "ethnic origin, race, colour, national extraction, social origin, social class or economic status; or gender, sex, pregnancy, marital status, sexual orientation or family responsibilities; or age, state of health, HIV/AIDS status, or disability; or religion or political opinion; or trade union membership or activity; or involvement in any dispute, an investigation or legal proceedings" is prohibited.

== Statistics ==
According to a 2005 study, about 14% of young Tuvaluan men between the age of 15 and 24 had had sex with a male partner sometime in their lives.

According to 2017 estimates from UNAIDS, there were about 300 men who have sex with men (MSM) in the country, and about 40 pinapinaaine (transgender people).

== Summary table ==
Same-sex sexual activity legal	No (For males, not enforced, legalization proposed)/ Yes (For females)
Equal age of consent	No (For males)/ Yes (For females)
Anti-discrimination laws in employment only	Yes (Since 2017)
Anti-discrimination laws in the provision of goods and services	No
Anti-discrimination laws in all other areas (Incl. indirect discrimination, hate speech)	No
Same-sex marriages	No (Constitutional ban since 2023)
Recognition of same-sex couples	No
Stepchild adoption by same-sex couples	No
Joint adoption by same-sex couples	No
LGBTQ people allowed to serve openly in the military	Has no military
Right to change legal gender	
Access to IVF for lesbians	No
Commercial surrogacy for gay male couples	No
MSMs allowed to donate blood	No

== See also ==
- Law of Tuvalu
- Human rights in Tuvalu
- LGBTQ rights in Oceania
- LGBTQ rights in the Commonwealth of Nations
