= Crime in Tuvalu =

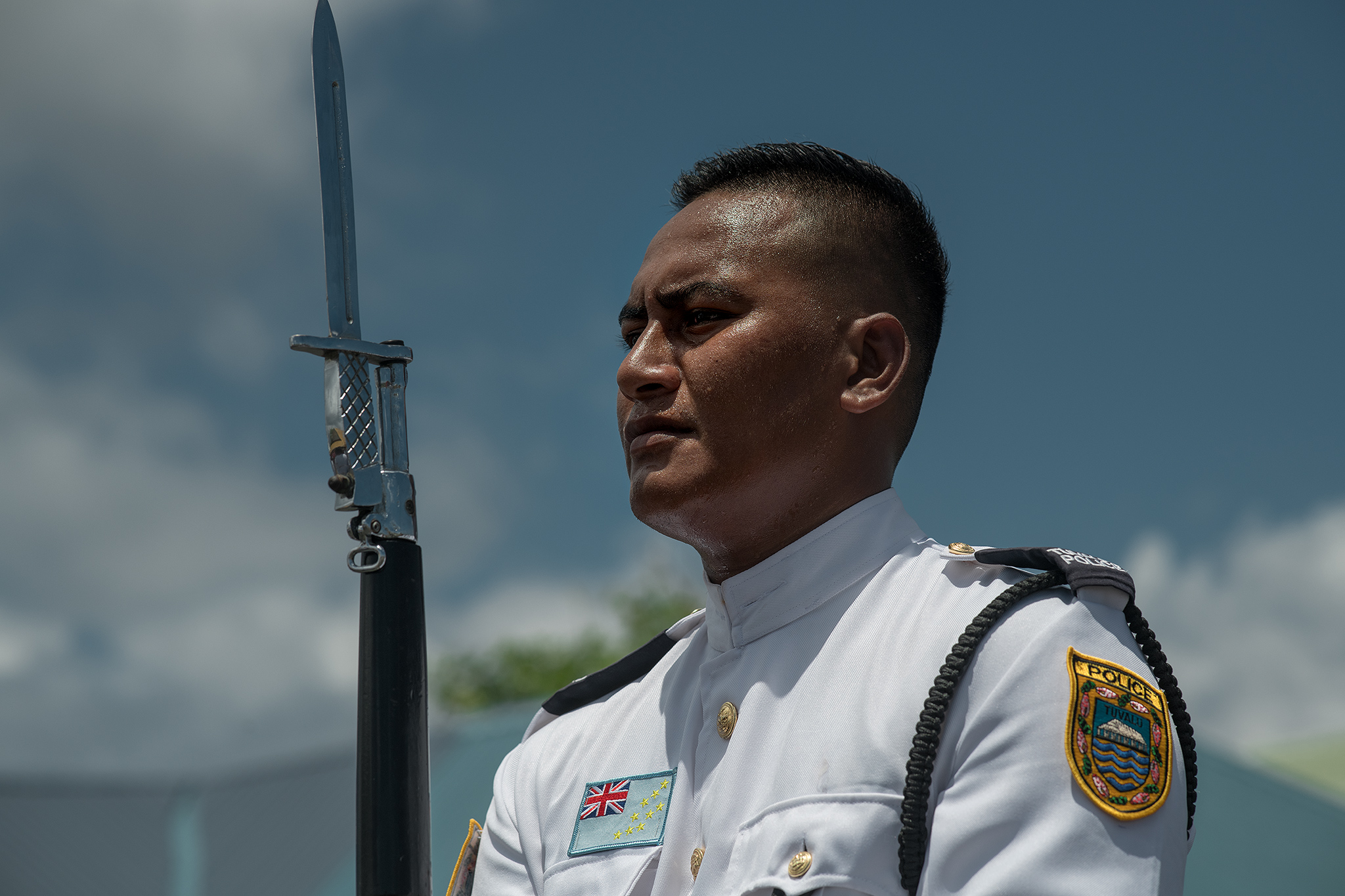
A Tuvaluan police officer during the visit of President Tsai of the Republic of China.

Crime in Tuvalu is not a significant social problem due to small population, geographic isolation, and low development.

Tuvalu, like other island nations in the West Pacific, is utilised as a staging point in the illicit drug trade between South East Asia and Australasia. There were 2 murders in 2012, resulting in a per capita average higher than most countries. Tuvalu has a police service and an island based Magistrates Court system. Serious offences, such as rape and murder, are dealt with in the High Court of Tuvalu.

== Social institutions of Tuvalu ==
Each island has its own high-chief, or ulu-aliki, and several sub-chiefs (alikis). The community council is the Falekaupule (the traditional assembly of elders) or te sina o fenua (literally: "grey-hairs of the land"). As defined in the Falekaupule Act (1997), Falekaupule means "traditional assembly in each island...composed in accordance with the Aganu of each island". Aganu means traditional customs and culture.

Section 41 and Schedule 3 of the Falekaupule Act (1997) provides that “[i]t shall be the duty of every Falekaupule and of every Kaupule to use its resources to assist the police in the detection and prevention of crime within the area of its authority.”

The ulu-aliki and aliki exercise informal authority on each island. Ulu-aliki are always chosen based on ancestry. Their powers are now shared with the pule o kaupule (elected village presidents; one on each island).

== The Criminal Law of Tuvalu ==
The Penal Code (1965) was first enacted during the time that Tuvalu was part of the Gilbert and Ellice Islands Colony. The Code is drafted to provide the complete criminal code of Tuvalu, although the Code is supplemented by offences created in other legislation including the Dangerous Drugs Act (1948), Alcoholic Drink Act (1985), Arms and Ammunition Act (1964) and the Counter Terrorism and Transnational Organised Crime Act (2009). The Criminal Procedure Code (1963) provides for powers of arrest and search and rule for the administration of the criminal proceedings in the courts. In 2014, the Penal Code was amended to reduce the penalty for murder from life imprisonment to a minimum 15 years with the court having the discretion to impose a sentence of over 15 years.

While human trafficking is not a problem in Tuvalu, the Counter Terrorism and Transnational Organised Crime Act 2009 (2009) provides protection for trafficking victims, particularly children. It expressly forbids the trafficking of children into and within Tuvalu or to another country for any purpose. It also provides trafficking victims with legal protections from criminal prosecution. The Penal Code (1965) provides for an offence of cruelty to children in section 226.

The central role of religious institutions in the Tuvaluan community is acknowledged in the Constitution of Tuvalu. The Preamble to the Constitution, includes a declaration that Tuvalu is a Christian nation founded on Christian principles, (section 29(1)), along with other values also recognised:

“(1) The Preamble acknowledges that Tuvalu is an Independent State based on Christian principles; Tuvaluan values, culture and tradition; the Rule of Law; and respect for human dignity.

Part XV of the Penal Code (1965) creates offences relating to religion: insult to religion of any class (s. 123); disturbing religious assemblies (s. 124); trespassing on burial places (s. 125); hindering burial of dead body, etc. (s. 126); and writing or uttering words with intent to wound religious feelings (s. 127). As well, sorcery is an offence under section 183.

The legislation that is part of the Law of Tuvalu is published online by the Office of the Attorney General of Tuvalu.

== Tuvalu Police Service ==
Tuvalu’s national police force, the Tuvalu Police Service, is headquartered in Funafuti. It includes a maritime surveillance unit, customs, prisons and immigration. Police officers wear British style uniforms. The police have a Pacific-class patrol boat, the HMTSS Te Mataili, provided by Australia in October 1994 under the Pacific Patrol Boat Program for use in maritime surveillance and fishery patrol and for search-and-rescue missions.

- The police service is managed in accordance with the Police Powers and Duties Act (2009) and the Police Powers and Duties Regulations (2012).
- Powers of arrest and search are described in Part III of the Criminal Procedure Code (1963).

== The People's Lawyer in Tuvalu ==
There are no lawyers in private practice in Tuvalu. The government funds the service of the "People's Lawyer", whose advice services are available free of charge for arrested persons. The People's Lawyer not only acts as the public defender but also represents people in the courts for cases that involve "land dispute resolution, civil disputes, family and some business formation." The People's Lawyer is based on the main island of Funafuti; the outer islands may have limited access to legal services as the people's lawyer infrequently travels to the outer islands.

- The services of the People's Lawyer is managed under the People’s Lawyer Act (1988) and the People's Lawyer (Fees) Regulations (2012).

According to a 2008 source, "there have been instances [in which] the position of the People’s Lawyer has remained unfulfilled for significant periods of time causing excessive delay in hearing clients’ cases." For the greater part of the position's history, the Australian Volunteers International Scheme recruited expatriate lawyers from either Australia or the United Kingdom to serve as The People's Lawyer. Since 2010, the position has been filled by Tuvaluans: Isala T. Isala (male lawyer; 2010-2015) and Filiga Taukiei Niko (female lawyer; 2015 - ).

The People's Lawyer in Tuvalu (Complete Table)
Name	Term
Ross Jack (who established the office)	c. 1985-1986
Alan Marsh	c. 1986-1988
Graham Rounce	c. 1988-1990
Paul Barber	c. 1990-1993
Philip Ells	c. 1993-1996
Nicholas Barnes	c. 1997-1998
James Duckworth	c. 1999-2004
Steve Barlow	c. 2005-2007
Joelle Grover (1st female)	c. 2007-2009
Isala Tito Isala (1st Tuvaluan)	c. 2010-2015
Filiga Taukiei Niko (1st Tuvaluan female)	c. 2015-

== Magistrates Court and High Court ==
The jurisdiction of the Magistrates Court is described in Part II of the Criminal Procedure Code (1963); any offence may be tried by the Senior Magistrate's Court where the penalty does not exceed a term of imprisonment for a term of 14 years (s. 4). However the sentences the Senior Magistrate's Court may impose are limited to imprisonment for a term not exceeding 5 years and a fine not exceeding $1,000 (s. 7 of Criminal Procedure Code).

The superior court is the High Court of Tuvalu as it has unlimited jurisdiction to try criminal offences and to impose the penalties set out in the Part VI of the Penal Code and in other legislation (s. 6 of Criminal Procedure Code). The High Court also hears appeals from the Magistrates Court.

The criminal justice system is administered under the provisions of:

- The Constitution of Tuvalu, the Criminal Procedure Code (1963), the Magistrates’ Courts Act (1963) and the Magistrates’ Courts (Costs in Criminal Cases) Rules (1965).
- Mutual Assistance in Criminal Matters Act (2004) and the Proceeds of Crime Act (2004).
- Sentencing of convicted offenders is addressed in Part VI of the Penal Code (which provides for punishments that include prison, fines and weekend detention) and the Rehabilitation of Offenders Act (1991).

== Tuvalu’s prison ==
The jail is on Fongafale islet on Funafuti. Tuvalu’s jail is administered under the Prisons Act (1985) and the Prisons Regulations (1952).

The United States Department of State provide periodic reports as to aspects of human rights practice in Tuvalu including information on the prison system:

- As of October 2010 Tuvalu’s jail held 7 convicted prisoners and one pretrial detainee, all male. The pretrial detainee was held in a separate facility from the prisoners. At that time there were no juvenile offenders (defined as those under age 18) in custody.
- As of December 2012 Tuvalu’s jail held 12 convicted prisoners (11 men and one woman). There were no juvenile offenders or pretrial detainees.
- As of September 2013 Tuvalu’s jail held 8 convicted prisoners, all men.
- As of August 2014 Tuvalu’s jail held 11 convicted prisoners, all men.

== Crimes against morality including rape and unlawful sexual intercourse ==
Part XVI of the Penal Code (1965), provides for offences against morality, which include: rape (s. 128); abduction of girl under 18 years of age with intent to have sexual intercourse (s. 132); indecent assaults on females (s. 133); defilement of girl under 13 years of age (s. 134); and defilement of a girl between 13 and 15 years of age, or of idiot or imbecile (s.125). The punishment of rape is a minimum sentence of five years' imprisonment, however spousal rape is not included in the legal definition of the offence of rape.

Domestic violence is considered in Tuvalu’s 2009 Report on compliance with the Convention on the Elimination of all Forms of Discrimination against Women to the Committee on the Elimination of Discrimination against Women. The Report said that “Committee’s experts expressed concern over the sanctioning of local custom in the [Tuvalu] Constitution and legal system, noting, for example, that husbands were permitted to ‘discipline’ their wives [as well as children]”. As many Tuvaluan families have migrated to New Zealand these practices are in direct conflict with New Zealand’s laws and social environment.

The United States Department of State provide periodic reports as to aspects of human rights practice in Tuvalu including information on rape and domestic violence:

- In 2010 there were both arrests and trials for rape-related offenses. The High Court convicted one defendant of rape and sentenced him to seven years' imprisonment. A second rape case was scheduled for trial in March 2011.
- In 2012 one case of attempted rape was prosecuted. There were also five sexual assault cases, one case of defilement, and three cases of indecent assault.
- In 2013 there were prosecutions of two sexual assault cases, one case of defilement, and one case of indecent assault.

The Penal Code (1965) does not specifically address domestic violence, which is prosecuted under the common assault provisions of the Code. The maximum penalty for common assault is six months’ imprisonment, and for assault with actual bodily harm, the penalty is up to five years’ imprisonment. The police service report that as of September 2012, there were 93 domestic violence cases on record. The police also report that it has a dedicated Domestic Violence Unit and that it operates a “no-drop” policy in relation to the conduct of prosecutions of violence against women.

In July 2013 the Pacific Regional Rights Resource Team of the Secretariat of the Pacific Community published drafting options for legislative reform to assist Tuvalu to make changes to the laws and policies relating to violence against women in order to ensure the full protection of women from all forms of violence. The Tuvalu National Council of Women, operates a Women’s Crisis Center, in Funafuti, which provided counselling services, but there were no shelters or hotlines for abused women.

The U.S. Department of State’s Report on Human Rights Practices for 2014 stated that the Tuvaluan police have a Domestic Violence Unit and a “no-drop” (evidence-based) prosecution policy in cases of violence against women and operated a 24-hour emergency line for victims of domestic violence. As of August 2014 the police reported 100 domestic violence cases.

== Crime and offences statistics ==
The Tuvalu Central Statistics Division has published crime and offences statistics for the period 1996-2003. The population of Tuvalu was 9,561 at the 2002 census. (Note: The population of Tuvalu was 9,561 at the 2002 census and the population at the 2012 census was 10,837 (2012 Population & Housing Census Preliminary Analytical Report).) The statistics are limited to crimes reported, so that they do not identify the number of subsequent prosecutions or convictions; nor do the statistics, in relation to crimes against persons, differentiate between common assaults and the more serious offences against a person. The crime and offences statistics as of 2003 are:

Type of offence reported	Number of reported offences
Total number of crimes reported	2,345
Number of crimes against persons reported	1,666
Number of crimes against property reported	591
Number of crimes without victims reported	0
Number of other crimes reported	88
