= Falekaupule =

Tuvaluan traditional assembly of elders

The Falekaupule on each of the Islands of Tuvalu is the traditional assembly of elders or te sina o fenua (literally: "grey-hairs of the land" in the Tuvaluan language). Under the Falekaupule Act (1997), the powers and functions of the Falekaupule are now shared with the Kaupule on each island, which is the executive arm of the Falekaupule, whose members are elected. The Kaupule has an elected president - pule o kaupule; an appointed treasurer - ofisa ten tupe; and is managed by a committee appointed by the Kaupule.

The Falekaupule Act (1997) defines the Falekaupule to mean "traditional assembly in each island ... composed in accordance with the Aganu of each island". Aganu means traditional customs and culture. The Falekaupule on each island has existed from time immemorial and continues to act as the local government of each island. Generally men aged 50 years, and on some islands men aged 60 years, do most of the talking and decision making at meetings of the community councils (Falekaupule), which are organised according to the law and custom of each island. Although women can vote in meetings of the Falekaupule on 7 of the 9 islands, most do not exercise their voting rights.

The traditional island meeting hall where important matters are discussed and which is also used for wedding celebrations and community activities is also known as the falekaupule or maneapa.

== Establishment of the Kaupule ==
Section 5 (1) of the Falekaupule Act (1997) establishes the Kaupule of each Falekaupule, with six members who are elected as provided for in section 8. Section 5 (1) establishes that the Kaupule is the executive arm of the Falekaupule and performs all the functions conferred on the Falekaupule by the Falekaupule Act or any other Act, except for certain specified functions. Under section 6 the Kaupule is a “body corporate having perpetual succession and a common seal and shall be capable of suing and being sued and of acquiring, holding and disposing of movable and immovable property.” Under section 18 provides for the election of the Pule o Kaupule - the person elected to preside over a Kaupule.

== Functions of the Falekaupule ==
As described in section 40 and Schedule 3 of the Falekaupule Act (1997) the general functions of a Falekaupule includes local government functions related to agriculture, livestock and fisheries; building and town or village planning; education; forestry and trees; land; relief of famine and drought; markets; public health; public order, peace and safety; communications and public utilities; trade and industry; and other miscellaneous functions.

The educational function of the Falekaupule includes responsibility to build, equip, maintain or manage any kindergarten primary school and primary school in the Falekaupule area; to supervise the compulsory education of children or specified categories of children between the ages of 5 and 15 years in accordance with the Education Act; and to grant and maintain scholarships or bursaries to persons resident in the Falekaupule area to attend any school or other educational institution in Tuvalu or elsewhere. The government secondary school in Tuvalu is Motufoua Secondary School, which is located on Vaitupu. Students board at the school during the school term, returning to their home islands each school vacation. Fetuvalu Secondary School, a day school operated by the Church of Tuvalu, is on Funafuti. Among the miscellaneous functions the Falekaupule is responsible for registering marriages, births or deaths. The Falekaupule is also directed to preserve the heritage of each island such as promoting and regulating the development of an arts and crafts industry; and the protection and preservation of the traditional culture of the Falekaupule area, including powers to prohibit or control the removal from it of any antique artifact.

In accordance with section 41 and Schedule 3 “[i]t shall be the duty of every Falekaupule and of every Kaupule to use its resources to assist the police in the detection and prevention of crime within the area of its authority.”

== Important role of the Falekaupule ==
The 2023 amendments to the Constitution recognise the Falekaupule as the traditional governing authorities of the islands of Tuvalu.

The ‘Principles of the Constitution’ states:

4. Amongst the values that we the people of Tuvalu seek to maintain are those embodied in our traditional forms of community, the Falekaupule, and the strength and support of the family and family discipline”; and

5. In government, and in social affairs generally, the guiding principles of Tuvalu are:

(a) agreement, courtesy and the search for consensus, in accordance with traditional Tuvaluan procedures, rather than alien ideas of confrontation and divisiveness;

(b) the need for mutual respect and co-operation between the different kinds of authorities concerned, including the central Government, the traditional authorities, Falekaupule, and the religious authorities.

Section 140 states: “The role of the ‘Falekaupule‘, as the island traditional governing authority on each of the islands of Tuvalu, is hereby recognized. The ‘Falekaupule‘ derives its authority from the island's culture, traditions and values and an Act of Parliament.”

== Falekaupule Trust Fund (FTF) ==
The role of each Falekaupule in the economy of each island is assisted by the operation of the Falekaupule Trust Fund (FTF), which is a trust fund for outer island development that was established following the success of the Tuvalu Trust Fund in the management of the Economy of Tuvalu. The Asian Development Bank (ADB) provided A$6 million in loan funds, with the FTF being established in July 1999 and with the funds being invested in February 2000. The Government of Tuvalu agreed to match the amount provided by the ADB, with contributions from each of the eight island communities of Tuvalu, and with the contributions from the island contributions also matched by the Government. The governance structure of the FTF follows that of the Tuvalu Trust Fund, but each with island community having a representative on the board and the government provides a non-voting chair. In 2001 the value of the FTF was around $15 million of which $1.2 million was contributed by the island communities.

== Limits to the power of the Falekaupule ==
The traditional power of the high-chief, or ulu-aliki, and the sub-chiefs (alikis) and the Falekaupule was without challenge. The consequence of defying the customary authority of the Falekaupule could result in customary process known as falaesea (to banishment a person from the island). A possible example of banishment is that in the late 17th century fighting occurred in Niutao between competing leaders. The followers of the defeated leaders were forced off Niutao and were allowed to settle on Nanumea.

Tuvalu is now parliamentary democracy with the Constitution of Tuvalu stating that it is "the supreme law of Tuvalu" and that "all other laws shall be interpreted and applied subject to this Constitution"; it sets out the Principles of the Bill of Rights and the Protection of the Fundamental Rights and Freedoms. Therefore, the traditional power of the Falekaupule is proscribed by the Constitution and by other elements of the Law of Tuvalu.

=== The relationship with members of parliament ===
The role of the member of the Parliament of Tuvalu in the parliamentary democracy established in the Constitution and the ability of Falekaupule to direct an MP as to their conduct as a member, was considered by the High Court of Tuvalu in Nukufetau v. Metia. The Falekaupule of Nukufetau directed Lotoala Metia, the elected member of parliament, as to which group of members he should join and when this directive was not followed the Falekaupule ordered Metia to resign as a member of parliament. When the Falekaupule attempted to enforce these directives through legal action, Ward CJ determined that the Constitution is structured around the concept of a parliamentary democracy; and that “[o]ne of the most fundamental aspects of parliamentary democracy is that, whilst a person is elected to represent the people of the district from which he is elected, he is not bound to act in accordance with the directives of the electorate either individually or as a body. He is elected because a majority of the voters regard him as the candidate best equipped to represent them and their interests in the government of their country. He is bound by the rules of parliament and answerable to parliament for the manner in which he acts. Should he lose the confidence of the electorate, he cannot be obliged to resign and he can only be removed for one of the reasons set out in sections 96 to 99 of the Constitution.”

The Chief Justice also considered the question as to whether an MP's customary obligation to obey the commands of the island as expressed by the Falekaupule, overrides the MP's duties to Parliament. The Falekaupule asserted that the customary process known as falaesea (to banishment a person who defied the customary authority of the Falekaupule) provided the legal authority to order Metia to resign as a member of parliament. The Chief Justice stated that “[i]f the fifth principle of the Preamble is to have any real meaning, it must apply to this case. The Constitution is law for the whole of Tuvalu. It clearly and properly acknowledges the customary role of, and respect for, the falekaupule on each island but, when support for an island's custom and tradition will have a disproportionate effect on the whole country, the island's interests must be subordinated to the national interest. The constitutional preservation of those traditional values is a vital part of present day Tuvalu but I cannot accept that a decision to implement them on one island is reasonable if it will seriously have an adverse effect on the whole country. In the present case, I am satisfied that it was unreasonable for the Falekaupule to ignore the interests of the whole country over an affront to its dignity by one of the island community.”

The Chief Justice went on to state that “the carrying out of those threats by the orders banishing Metia and thus preventing him from properly performing the duties for which he was elected were clearly contrary to the spirit and intent of the Constitution and a totally unacceptable intrusion into the workings of the Tuvaluan Parliament. It should be borne in mind that the supremacy given Parliament by the Constitution is over the country as a whole and must, therefore, take precedence over purely local interests if the latter are in conflict with the national interest. I am satisfied that, as it was a challenge to parliamentary supremacy, it was unreasonable and was thus a breach of the defendant's right to procedural fairness. Similarly, the order of falaesea, although a part of the customary practices of Nukufetau, was so extremely disproportionate to the actions of the Falekaupule in similar previous cases as to be unfair.”

=== Ability to restrict the exercise of freedoms protected by the Constitution ===
Teonea v. Pule o Kaupule of Nanumaga is a case that raised issues in relation to the balancing the freedoms of religion, expression and association that are set out in the Constitution of Tuvalu against the values of Tuvaluan stability and culture that are also referred to in the Constitution. The dispute arose in July 2003 when the Falekaupule of Nanumaga passed a resolution that had the effect of banning the Brethren Church from seeking converts in Nanumaga. The Falekaupule had decided that the preaching of the Brethren Church was causing division in the Nanumaga community.

The decision of Ward CJ balanced the freedoms of religion, expression and association against the values of Tuvaluan stability and culture, with the Chief Justice accepting the evidence of the unrest and tension on Nanumaga. The decision of the Chief Justice was to refuse to grant the declaration sought by Mase Teonea – that the resolution was unlawful as it was contrary to the Constitution.

In the Court of Appeal of Tuvalu the majority judgments of Fisher and Paterson JJA allowed the appeal, so that the judgment of the Chief Justice was set aside. The Court of Appeal made the declaration that the resolution of the Falekaupule of 4 July 2003 was contrary to the Constitution. Tomkins JA provided a minority opinion in which he accepted the decision of the Chief Justice and would have dismissed the appeal.

The approach to the constitutional questions that the Court of Appeal should take was described by Paterson JA who stated:

“[I]t is my view that it is for the Court to determine whether the circumstances are such that it is necessary to regulate or place some restriction on the exercise of the rights at issue in this case. The balancing act requires a consideration of the importance of the freedoms in question and whether it is necessary to regulate or place some restrictions on the exercise of those freedoms if the exercise:
[a] may be divisive, unsettling or offensive to the people; or
[b] may directly threaten Tuvaluan values or culture.
Section 29(5) of the Constitution makes it clear that a restriction may be lawful even if it restricts religious freedom, if the exercise of the rights would lead to the results specified in section 29(4). This provision is subject to sections 12 and 15 which provides that any restriction must be reasonably justifiable in a democratic society that has a proper respect for human rights and dignity when considered in the light of the circumstances existing at the time.”
