= Human rights in Tuvalu =

Tuvalu is a small island nation in the South Pacific, located North of Fiji and North West of Samoa. The population at the 2012 census was 10,837 (2012 Population & Housing Census Preliminary Analytical Report). Tuvalu has a written constitution which includes a statement of rights influenced by the United Nations Universal Declaration of Human Rights and the European Convention on Human Rights. While most human rights in Tuvalu are respected, areas of concern include women’s rights and freedom of belief, as well as diminishing access to human rights in the face of global warming. The latter has played a major role in the implementation of human rights actions in Tuvalu given its geographical vulnerability and scarce resources.

== Constitution ==
The Constitution of Tuvalu states that it is "the supreme law of Tuvalu" and that "all other laws shall be interpreted and applied subject to this Constitution"; it sets out the Principles of the Bill of Rights and the Protection of the Fundamental Rights and Freedoms.

The 2023 amendments to the Constitution balances Christian values, Tuvaluan values or culture, and also human rights recognised by international treaties and conventions, such as constitutional prohibitions on discrimination against people with disabilities and on the grounds of sex to provide greater protections for women.

== International treaties ==
Tuvalu became one of the smallest members of the United Nations on 5 September 2000. It has ratified two of the nine core human rights treaties - The Convention on the Elimination of All Forms of Discrimination against Women (CEDAW) and the Convention on the Rights of the Child (CRC). During its Universal Period Review in December 2008, Tuvalu accepted recommendations to ratify human rights treaties to which it is not yet a party, although the report noted that Tuvalu was not actively combating discriminatory societal behaviours, including by working at reforming domestic laws, in particular land and family laws, which require amendments in order to be in compliance with CEDAW.

Tuvalu has ratified Convention on the Rights of Persons with Disabilities.

Tuvalu has commitments to ensuring human rights are respected under the Universal periodic Review (UPR), the Sustainable Development Goals (SDGs) and the Te Kakeega III - National Strategy for Sustainable Development-2016-2020 (TK III), which sets out the development agenda of the Government of Tuvalu.

== Women's rights ==
In 1980, the Tuvalu National Council for Women was formally established as an umbrella organisation to advocate for the rights of women in the country. It works to highlight problems facing women, including lack of access to education, or their legal, political and social rights. Tuvalu acceded to the Convention on the Elimination of All Forms of Discrimination against Women (CEDAW) in 1999, however, it has not been implemented into Tuvalu’s national legal system.

The 2023 amendments to the Constitution now prohibits discrimination against people grounds of sex to provide greater protections for women Previously the Constitution prohibited discrimination on the basis of race, colour, and place of origin, with no mention of gender. In 2005 the High Court of Tuvalu held that this omission was deliberate, therefore there was no constitutional protection against sex discrimination at the time of the decision of the court.

Domestic violence is a problem in Tuvalu, with a 2007 demographic and health survey conducted by the Secretariat of the Pacific Community reporting that approximately 47 percent of the women surveyed had experienced some type of violence in their lifetime. Police have been criticised for seeking to address violence against women using traditional and customary methods of reconciliation rather than criminal prosecution.

The problem of violence against Tuvaluan women was highlighted during a week of events in recognition of International Women's Day in March 2013. The traditional cultural values prevent or discourage women from reporting assaults. Legislative changes are proposed to give the Tuvalu police increased powers and allowing the courts to pass tougher sentences for crimes of violence against women.

The UN CEDAW Committee observations on the 2015 review of Tuvalu notes the introduction of new domestic violence legislation, more participation by women in local council meetings and the end of some discriminatory education practices. Violence against women is also described as a concern because of the "cultural and the silence and also impunity and this also really stop women to report the cases."

Tuvalu has generally progressed through gender equality in the community and workplaces in adherence to Convention on the Elimination of All Forms of Discrimination against Women and continues to address violence against women. In 2014, Parliament passed the Family Protection and Domestic Violence Act which marks a big step forward for the country in its fight for violence against women. In the Tuvalu National Human Rights Action Plan 2016-2020, the government addressed the need for more representation of women in high government positions, Parliament and in local councils. It was emphasized that if the country wants to successfully implement its policies of gender equality then it needs women to be also present at the decision-making table to offer their views, as women, on how they want to be treated in society.

== Children's rights ==
Tuvalu ratified the Convention on the Rights of the Child in 1995. It was the first international human rights convention for the country to ratify recognizing the protection of children in society. The Family Protection and Domestic Violence Act were passed in 2014 to help protect children. Further studies are planned. The government of Tuvalu remains committed to the protection of children's rights within sound legal framework and have worked with governments, regional and international organisations to help safeguard this.

== Sexual minorities ==
The 2023 amendments to the Constitution do not provide for the recognition LGBT rights in Tuvalu. The freedom from discrimination in section 27, describes discrimination as referring to the treatment of different people in different ways wholly or mainly because of their different sex (among other protected attributes), and does not refer to different sexual orientation.

The 2023 amendments to the Constitution also set out the Charter of Duties and Responsibilities. However, the only statement as to relationships is to “a family unit, which shall comprise a marriage as between a man and a woman to the exclusion of all others”. Section 43(2) states:

Under this Constitution every person has the following fundamental duties and responsibilities to themselves, their dependents, and others –

(a) to respect society, communities, islands, leaders, and cultural practices and norms; to know their duties and roles in society despite different religious beliefs and practices, to participate in and contribute to Island Communities; to work towards their own improvement, to live and work in peace and harmony with others and to use rights in a way that will not harm others;
(b) to uphold the Christian principles of a family unit, which shall comprise a marriage as between a man and a woman to the exclusion of all others, and their offspring as the foundation of the Tuvaluan society; ….

There is a transgender population in Tuvalu. Transgender women were called pinapinaaine.

While sodomy is illegal in Tuvalu and carries a maximum penalty of 14 years imprisonment, this law has not been used to prosecute citizens in recent years, and discrimination based on sexual orientation is not common.

== Rights of persons with disabilities ==
The 2023 amendments to the Constitution provides a constitutional prohibition on discrimination against people with disabilities.

Tuvalu ratified the Convention on the Rights of Persons with Disabilities (CRPD) in 2013. The Australian Department of Foreign Affairs and Trade (DFAT) is supporting a disability study in Tuvalu with the partnerships of the government and Fusi Alofa, to inform other areas that need support around disability rights.

== Freedom of speech and the press ==
Part II of The Constitution of Tuvalu provide for freedom of speech and freedom of the press, and the government generally respects these rights as they are fundamental to a democratic society. The three branches of government effectively work together to promote freedom of the press and speech so the nation is informed of important information beyond their reach. The Tuvalu Media Corporation is the sole media organization in the country with a sole radio station that keeps the nation informed on significant national and international affairs. It is not a private media organization and is, therefore, run by the government. Tuvalu remains peaceful and free and the press, although under government control, is an independent organization.

== Right to vote ==
Tuvalu uses the First-past-the-post voting system where one person equals one vote, held by secret ballots based on universal and equal suffrage. General elections are held every four years, unless the Prime Minister, with the support of his government, decides to call an earlier one. After the 2010 general election (Elections and political parties in Tuvalu), there was a controversial issue regarding the Nukufetau constituency. In Nukufetau v Metia, the Nukufetau local Council requested that Lotoala Metia, one of the two representatives of the constituency in Parliament, to support the bid of the other representative, Enele Sopoaga, of Prime Minister.

Metia’s refusal to follow through caused an uproar that ran a wedge through the community culminating in protests on the streets of Funafuti demanding that he step down. The plaintiff, argued that the seat held by Metia is for the people of the constituency, and the local council, are the voice of the people, therefore, it is their seat and they have the right to fill the seat with the person of their choice. The defendant argued that the people had just elected him the previous year to serve another term therefore, they have chosen him to fill the seat.

Furthermore, he argued that the involvement of the local council is purely political. This issue brings to light the integrity of the ballot boxes and the right of the people, in a democratic society, to elect their preferred candidates. Once the victorious candidates take the oath of office, they are the voice of the people, and local bodies should, as always, stay out of the jurisdictions of the legislature. The way members of parliaments vote in Parliament, whether in a Parliament sitting or party internal votes, should be at their own discretion and not dictated by an outside body.

== Global warming ==
As it is a low lying island, it has been predicted that Tuvalu will be the first nation to be wiped out due to global warming. The impact of global warming is curtailing some of the human rights of Tuvalu’s citizens including the right to life and the right to health. If Tuvalu is able to establish these human rights violations, it may be able to seek injunctive relief to prevent States from continuing to contribute to global warming through the UN Office of the High Commissioner for Human Rights (OHCHR). Those seeking to leave the island due to global warming do not fit the legal definition of a ‘refugee’, as set out in the United Nations Convention Relating to the Status of Refugees. Thus as current international law stands, Tuvaluans seeking to escape the effects of global warming are not privy to the extensive legal protections offered to those who do fulfill the definition of refugee.

In 2014 attention was drawn to an appealed to the New Zealand Immigration and Protection Tribunal against the deportation of a Tuvaluan family on the basis that they were “climate change refugees”, who would suffer hardship resulting from the environmental degradation of Tuvalu. However the subsequent grant of residence permits to the family was made on grounds unrelated to the refugee claim. The family was successful in their appeal because, under the relevant immigration legislation, there were “exceptional circumstances of a humanitarian nature” that justified the grant of resident permits as the family was integrated into New Zealand society with a sizeable extended family which had effectively relocated to New Zealand. Indeed, in 2013 a claim of a Kiribati man of being a “climate change refugee” under the Convention relating to the Status of Refugees (1951) was determined by the New Zealand High Court to be untenable. Permanent migration to Australia and New Zealand, such as for family reunification, requires compliance with the immigration legislation of those countries.

On 10 November 2023, Tuvalu signed the Falepili Union, a bilateral diplomatic relationship with Australia, under which Australia will provide a pathway for citizens of Tuvalu to migrate to Australia, to enable climate-related mobility for Tuvaluans.

== National human rights institution ==
Tuvalu lacks a national human rights institution, and most enquiries from the public relating to human rights are received by the Tuvalu National Council of Women (TNCW)’s Legal Rights Training Officer and the Office of the People’s Lawyer. Both NGOs and Youth Groups alike run human rights workshops to inform their respective audiences of their rights.

In 2014 the office of the Chief Ombudsman was established, with the appointment of Sa'aga Talu Teafa. The primary role of the Chief Ombudsman is to work to achieve good governance through the enforcement of the Leadership Code Act.

== Freedom of belief ==
The 2023 amendments to the Constitution confirm the freedom of belief (section 23), while permitting laws to be enacted which is reasonably required in the interests of:

- defence; public safety; or public order; public morality; or public health (section 23(6)(a)); and
- “for the purpose of protecting the rights or freedoms of other persons, including the right to observe and practise any religion or belief without the unsolicited intervention of members of any other religion or belief” (section 23(6)(b)).

The 2023 amendments to the Constitution provide for the protection of Tuvaluan values in the statement of the ‘Principles of the Constitution’ and in (section 29):

“(1) The Preamble acknowledges that Tuvalu is an Independent State based on Christian principles; Tuvaluan values, culture and tradition; the Rule of Law; and respect for human dignity.
(2) This includes recognition of –

(a) the right to worship, or not to worship, in whatever way the conscience of the individual tells him; and
(b) the right to hold, to receive and to communicate opinions, ideas and information.

(3) Within Tuvalu, the freedoms of the individual can only be exercised having regard to the rights of other people, the Charter of Duties and Responsibilities in section 43, and to the effect on society.
(4) It may therefore be necessary in certain circumstances to regulate or place some restrictions on the exercise of those rights, if their exercise –

(a) may be divisive, unsettling or offensive to the people; or
(b) may directly threaten Tuvaluan values or culture.”

The Church of Tuvalu, (Te Ekalesia Kelisiano Tuvalu) is the de facto state church of Tuvalu, although in practice this merely entitles it to "the privilege of performing special services on major national events". Theologically the Church of Tuvalu is part of the Reformed tradition. Its adherents comprise about 97% of the 10,837 (2012 census) inhabitants of Tuvalu.

Religious groups are free to proselytizing or holding meetings. However, according to the 2008 Universal Periodic Review, the People’s Lawyer’s Office has received complaints from religious organizations concerned by limitations on their activities in the outer islands. In 2009 the Court of Appeal of Tuvalu confirmed the freedom of religious organisations to carry out their activities in a case that considered the freedoms of religion, expression and association that are set out in the Constitution of Tuvalu against the values of Tuvaluan culture and social stability that are also referred to in the Constitution. The U.S. State Department's International Religious Freedom Report for 2014 noted reports of discrimination against followers of non-traditional and minority religious groups who are viewed by some Tuvaluans as disrupting traditional societal structures.

== Improvement of human rights ==
Tuvalu has its shortfalls in the protection of individual rights. In 2016, the Tuvalu government published the (Tuvalu Human Rights National Action Plan 2016-2020) to bridge the gap and improve its national image regarding human rights. Tuvalu has engaged with both cycles of the Universal Periodic Review (2008 and 2013) and has issued an open invitation onto the United Nations special rapporteur in April 2013.

The Human Rights National Action Plan recognises that genuine improvements to human rights observance require not just resources and finances but also political will. To bring about a strong culture of human rights, including the prevention of domestic violence or child abuse, there is a need for an attitude change, education and training, capacity building and a strong judiciary.
