= Margaret Wilson (judge) =

Australian judge

The Honourable Margaret Wilson KC

Judge of the Supreme Court of Queensland
- In office 21 August 1998 – 11 April 2014

Personal details
- Born: 24 February 1953 (age 73)
- Occupation: Judge, barrister

Margaret Wilson KC (born 24 February 1953) is a former judge of the Supreme Court of Queensland in the Trial Division. She was appointed a Queen's Counsel in 1992 and served on the court from 1998 until 2014. She is also a graduate of the University of Queensland school of law.

In 2014 she was appointed a judge of the Solomon Islands Court of Appeal. She was the first female to serve as a Judge of the Solomon Islands Court of Appeal (2014) Rachel Subusola Olutimayin was the first female to serve as Solomon Islands' Director of Public Prosecutions five years later.

== See also ==
- List of judges of the Supreme Court of Queensland
