= Tuilotolava =

Tuilotolava is a surname. Notable people with the surname include:

- Louisa Tuilotolava (born 1996), New Zealand field hockey player
- Mele Tuilotolava, Tongan-New Zealand lawyer
