= Laingane Italeli Talia =

Attorney-General of Tuvalu

Attorney-General of Tuvalu
- Incumbent; Ms Laingane Italeli Talia since 2022
- Office of the Attorney-General
- Nominator: The Prime Minister of Tuvalu, acting in accordance with the advice of the Cabinet of Tuvalu given after consultation with the Public Service Commission
- Appointer: Governor-General of Tuvalu
- Constituting instrument: Section 81 of the Constitution of Tuvalu
- Deputy: Senior Crown Counsel

Laingane Italeli Talia, is the current Attorney-General of Tuvalu. She is the second female Tuvaluan lawyer who has been appointed Attorney-General; she succeeded Eselealofa Apinelu who was the first Tuvaluan female who qualified as a lawyer, and also the first female appointed as the Attorney-General.

As Attorney-General she attends meetings of the cabinet and also sits in the Parliament of Tuvalu, but does not vote; the parliamentary role of the Attorney-General is purely advisory. As the principal legal officer of Tuvalu, she is responsible for drafting legislation, and also advising the government and the government departments on legal matters related to government activities, such as the Tuvalu Climate Change Resilience Act 2019; and advising on Law of the sea issues, such as the operation of Tuvalu Seabed Minerals Act 2014, as Tuvalu's Exclusive Economic Zone (EEZ) covers an oceanic area of approximately 900,000 km^{2}.

An important role in the period from 1916 to 2023 was her work on the Tuvalu Constitutional Review Project. From 2016 to 2018, she was a member of the Secretariat that was established to support the work of the Constitutional Review Committee (CRC). Following her graduate degree study in London for an LLM, in 2020 she was appointed as the advisor to the Constitution Select Committee, which continued the work of the CRC. The Tuvalu Constitutional Review Project ended with the Parliament of Tuvalu enacting the Constitution of Tuvalu Act 2023. This revised constitution declared that Tuvalu's area, including maritime zones (that is, the EEZ) are permanent, regardless of any effects resulting from climate change.

== Education ==
In 2006, she commenced the LLB program at the University of the South Pacific (USP); following which she completed the Professional Diploma in Legal Practice so that she could be admitted to practice in the Courts of Law.

In 2018–2019, she studied for an LLM in Drafting Legislation, Regulation, and Policy at the Institute of Advanced Legislative Studies (IALS) of the University of London.

== Career ==
After completing her degree as USP she gained the position of Crown Counsel at the Attorney General's office in Tuvalu. After 5 years she was promoted to the role of Senior Crown Counsel, and acting Attorney General when Eselealofa Apinelu was absent from the office. In 2022 she was appointed the Attorney-General of Tuvalu.

== Representation of Tuvalu at international organisations ==
In July 2015, as acting Attorney-General, she represented Tuvalu at a meeting of the International Seabed Authority in Kingston, Jamaica, and in 2018 she was a member of Tuvalu's delegation that attended the meeting of the United Nations Human Rights Council for the conference on the Universal Periodic Review Report of the Working Group on Tuvalu.

In 2021 she was the Interim Deputy Permanent Representative and the First Secretary to the Permanent Representative of Tuvalu to the United Nations.

She represented Tuvalu at the United Nations in 2021, including speaking on Tuvalu's new initiative, which was later reflected in the drafting of the Constitution of Tuvalu Act 2023, to protect the statehood of small atoll nations facing existential threats from sea-level rise, and to preserve the sovereignty, rights and heritage of affected nations and their populations.

In December 2024, Talia was at the International Court of Justice (ICJ) helping to present a case regarding the rising sea levels threatening Tuvulu and other members of the Alliance of Small Island States. Vanuatu had arranged for the ICJ to advise on the legal position of the countries who caused this damage. She told the court that this was the largest threat to the existence of Tuvalu. Professor Phillipa Webb quoted the Tuvaluan activist Grace Malie at the meeting who has said, "Tuvalu will not go quietly into the rising sea."

== Constitutional Review Committee and Constitution Select Committee ==
From 2016 to 2018, she was a member of the Secretariat that was established to support the work of the Constitutional Review Committee (CRC), which was responsible for the implementation of the Tuvalu Constitutional Review Project.

In 2020 she was appointed as the advisor to the Constitution Select Committee, which continued the work of the CRC. The Tuvalu Constitutional Review Project ended with the Parliament of Tuvalu enacting the Constitution of Tuvalu Act 2023.

The 2023 amendments to the Constitution of Tuvalu Act 2023 adopt an innovative approach to determining the boundaries of the State of Tuvalu. Section 2(1) states the perpetual statehood of Tuvalu “notwithstanding the impacts of climate change or other causes resulting in loss to the physical territory of Tuvalu” Section 2(2) recognises the threat of climate change, and declares Tuvalu's area, including maritime zones (as set out in a schedule to the Constitution) are permanent, regardless of any effects resulting from climate change. This innovative approach follows that announced by the leaders of the Pacific Islands Forum countries who published a declaration on 6 August 2021 that recalled that Pacific Islands Forum Members have a long history of support for the United Nations Convention on the Law of the Sea (the “Convention”), and which declaration ended with a proclamation: “that our maritime zones, as established and notified to the Secretary-General of the United Nations in accordance with the Convention, and the rights and entitlements that flow from them, shall continue to apply, without reduction, notwithstanding any physical changes connected to climate change-related sea-level rise.”

Political offices
| Preceded by Eselealofa Apinelu | Attorney-General of Tuvalu; 2022 - present | Incumbent |

== Published works ==
- Italeli Talia, Laingane (2021). "Unwrapping the Effectiveness Test as a Measure of Legislative Quality: A Case Study of the Tuvalu Climate Change Resilience Act 2019". European Journal of Law Reform. 23 (1): 115. doi:10.5553/EJLR/138723702021023001005. S2CID 236701619.
