= Nadine Pidjot =

New Caledonian lawyer

Nadine Pidjot (born 1967) is a lawyer from New Caledonia. She was the first Kanak woman to become a lawyer.

Pidjot was born in Conception, New Caledonia, in 1967. She studied general law, completing a master's degree. She worked at the High Commission of the Republic of New Caledonia and the French Embassy in Australia. In 2006, Pidjot joined the administration of the Government of New Caledonia. In 2013 she left, and founded her own consulting firm.

In May 2017, Pidjot was admitted to the bar, becoming the first Kanak woman lawyer.

== See also ==
- List of first women lawyers and judges in Oceania
