= Pole Atanraoi-Reim =

I-Kiribati lawyer (died 2018)

Pole Atanraoi-Reim, Kiribati's first female lawyer, was born to Atanraoi and Ianeta Claire Baiteke. Her father Atanraoi, a retired diplomat, ecologist, and historian, served as Kiribati's first Secretary of Foreign Affairs.

Atanraoi-Reim received her higher education from Kiribati, New Zealand, and Papua New Guinea. In 1992, she became the first woman called to the Kiribati bar. She was also registered as a practicing lawyer in the Federated States of Micronesia. Her legal career included serving as the Assistant Attorney General and Chief of Litigation in the government of Micronesia, legal trainer for Fiji's Human Rights at the Regional Rights Resources Team / UNDP, and the Director of Public Prosecutions and Senior State Advocate in Kiribati. While working at the latter position, Atanraoi contributed to the book Customary land tenure and sustainable development: complementarity or conflict? (1995).

Prior to becoming a legal advisor for the Pacific Islands Forum Fisheries Agency (FFA) in 2015, Atanraoi-Reim served as a Legal Rights Resource Trainer for the Pacific Regional Rights Resource Team (RRRT) and an acting Attorney-General. She died on August 18, 2018, after battling cancer.

She is survived by her seven children - Junior Atanraoi Zackious, Ulutapu Thomas Zackious, Tabita (Kaitamwakin) Awira, Famelea Joan Awerika, Tanieru Awerika, Maerientaake Awerika and Violet Awerika.

== See also ==
- List of first women lawyers and judges in Oceania
