= Eselealofa Apinelu =

Tuvaluan lawyer and sports official

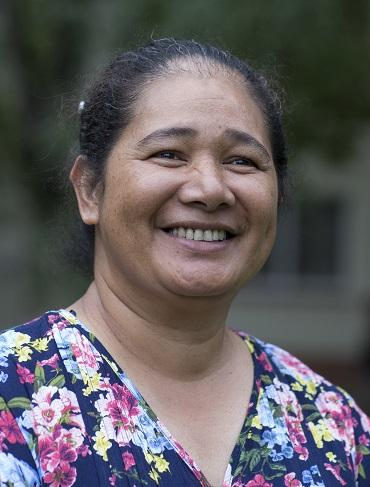
- Apinelu in 2019

High Commissioner to Fiji
- Incumbent
- Assumed office 2022
- Preceded by: Temate Melitiana

Attorney General of Tuvalu
- In office 2008–2022
- Preceded by: Iakoba Italeli
- Succeeded by: Laingane Italeli Talia

Personal details
- Education: University of Tasmania; University of South Pacific; Swinburne University

Eselealofa "Ese" Apinelu is a Tuvaluan lawyer and sports official. She is Tuvalu's first female lawyer.

== Education ==
Apinelu attended the Cathedral School, Townsville, Queensland, Australia. She graduated with a Bachelor of Arts and Bachelor of Laws from the University of Tasmania in 1998. Eselealofa holds a Professional Diploma in Legislative Drafting from the University of South Pacific. In 2022 she was awarded a PhD from Swinburne University’s Centre for Urban Transition. Her research focused on customary and human rights in post-colonial Tuvalu with a particular focus on the disconnection between individual and collective rights in Tuvalu's development agendas.

== Career ==
Apinelu was the senior crown counsel in Tuvalu from 2003 to 2006. She was appointed as the acting attorney general of Tuvalu in 2006. In 2008, Apinelu became the first female appointed as the attorney general of Tuvalu. In 2012, she became the first female executive member of the South Pacific Lawyers' Association (SPLA) and the chair of the SPLA Women in the Law Committee.

On 14 September 2022 she became Tuvalu's high commissioner to Fiji.

== Sports administrator ==
She was also president of the Tuvalu Volleyball Federation, and was the manager of Tuvalu's volleyball team at the 2003 South Pacific Games. She was the president of the Tuvalu Association of Sports and National Olympic Committee (TASNOC) from 2013 to 2015.

== See also ==
- List of first women lawyers and judges in Oceania

Diplomatic posts
Preceded by Temate Melitiana	High Commissioner to Fiji; 2022 - present	Incumbent
Political offices
Preceded by Iakoba Italeli	Attorney-General of Tuvalu; 2008 - 2022	Succeeded by Laingane Italeli Talia
