= Rosalie Konou =

Lawyer in the Marshall Islands

Rosalie Aten Konou is the Marshall Islands' first female lawyer. She has held the positions of head of the island nation's Legal Aid Office and Assistant Attorney General.

== See also ==
- List of first women lawyers and judges in Oceania
