= Ethel Sigimanu =

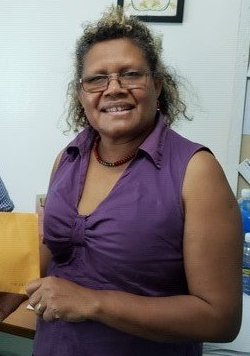
Sigimanu in 2019

Ethel Falu Sigimanu is a government official in the Solomon Islands. In 2017 she was reassigned from the role of permanent secretary at the Ministry of Women, Youth and Children Affairs to permanent secretary at the Ministry of Justice and Legal Affairs.

As part of her role, Sigimanu advocated for the passage of the Family Protection Act 2014, the first domestic violence legislation in Solomon Islands, and the Child and Family Welfare Act 2017. She also developed and reviewed national gender equality and women's development policies and was the co-ordinator of the Solomon Islands Family Health and Safety Study; the study published its findings in 2009, leading to an increased government focus on domestic and gender violence in the home.

Sigimanu serves on a number of national and regional boards particularly in the areas of gender and human rights. In 2019 Rachel Subusola Olutimayin became the Director of Public Prosecutions in the Soloman Islands. Sigimanu who was then the ministry of justice's permanent secretary gave her the contract and she noted the significance of Olutimayin's appointment as the first woman DPP.
