= Barina Waqa =

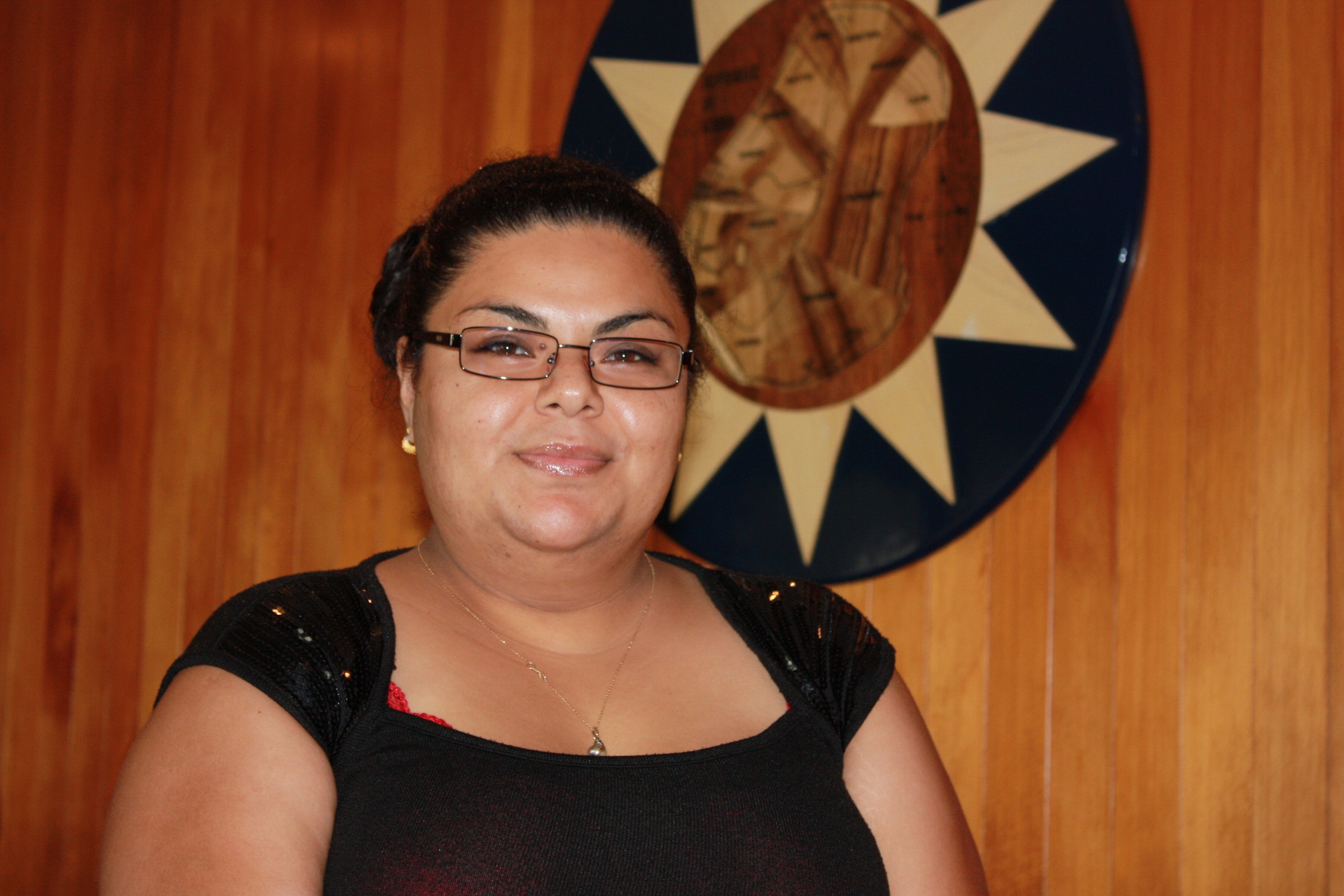
- Born: Nauru
- Citizenship: Nauru
- Education: University of the South Pacific
- Occupation: Civil servant
- Known for: Lawyer

Barina Waqa is the Secretary for Multi-Cultural Affairs with the Department of Justice and Border Control in Nauru. She is Nauru's first female lawyer.

== Career ==
In 2006, Waqa received an Australian Regional Development Scholarship through the Australia Awards for Development and completed a law degree at the University of the South Pacific in Vanuatu. She previously held the position of Principal Legal Officer with the Department of Justice and Border Control.

In 2011, Waqa received a scholarship from the Australian Bar Association to attend a trial advocacy course in Western Australia.

== See also ==
- List of first women lawyers and judges in Oceania
