= Maelyn Bird =

Maelyn Bird is a judge in Solomon Islands. One of the first female lawyers in her country, in 2019 she became the first native Solomon Islander woman to be named a judge on the High Court of Solomon Islands.

== Biography ==
Maelyn Bird is a native Solomon Islander. In the 1980s, she became one of Solomon Islands' first female lawyers, alongside Jean Gordon and Nuatali Tongarutu.

Bird spent more than three decades working as a public solicitor and as a private lawyer. During the period of ethnic violence on the islands in the late 1990s and early 2000s, her law building was burned to the ground, but she recovered and continued to practice.

In 2019, she became the first native Solomon Islander woman to be sworn in as a judge of the High Court of Solomon Islands. Some of her initial goals on the six-member court were to address its significant backlog and develop the country's case law. She has also used her position as a High Court judge to combat violence against women, describing herself as a survivor of domestic violence.
