= Renn Davis =

British colonial judge (1928–1997)

Sir Dermot Renn Davis, OBE (20 November 1928 – 6 June 1997) was a British colonial judge who was Chief Justice of the Solomon Islands, Gibraltar, Tuvalu, and Falkland Islands.
