= Denise Goupil =

American lawyer

Denise Girard-Goupil, the first female lawyer in French Polynesia, was born in 1931 to parents Emile Goupil and Eliane Garnier. According to official records, Emile served as a police officer, bailiff and deputy-notary during his life. Girard-Goupil's great-grandfather was Auguste Goupil (1847-1921), a prominent lawyer who owned a plantation in Papeete, French Polynesia. He struck a friendship with Impressionist painter Paul Gauguin. Auguste's daughter Jeanne was even the subject of Gauguin's painting “Portrait of a Young Woman. Vaïte (Jeanne) Goupil”.

Girard-Goupil registered as a lawyer at the Papeete Bar Association in 1961. In 1964, Girard-Goupil was appointed as the Head of the Land Affairs Department. In 1981, she was appointed as one of the lawyers authorized to act in favor of the Territory of French Polynesia. Around that time, she began serving as the President (Bâtonnier) of the Papeete Bar (1981-1984). In 1990, she coauthored the book L'indivision en Polynésie Française.

She died on May 26, 2017.

== See also ==
- List of first women lawyers and judges in Oceania
