= ʻAna Kata Nau =

Tongan attorney

- Born: March 17, 1899; Nelafu, Vavaʻu, Tonga
- Died: 1996 (aged 96–97)
- Education: Tupou College
- Occupation: Attorney
- Known for: First female attorney in Tonga

ʻAna Kata Nau was a Tongan attorney. She was the first female attorney in Tonga.

== Life ==
ʻAna Kata Nau was born on March 17, 1899, at Nelafu, Vavaʻu, Tonga to Tevita Kata Nau II (a reverend minister) and Sela Mahe. She received her education from Tupou College in Nukuʻalofa, Tonga, and initially embarked on careers as an educator (1921-1926; 1929) and nurse (1926-1929) before graduating as a lawyer. She died in 1996.

== See also ==
- List of first women lawyers and judges in Oceania
