= Angelyne Roy =

10th Attorney General of Vanuatu
- Incumbent
- Assumed office 16 June 2025
- President: Nikenike Vurobaravu
- Preceded by: Arnold Loughman

Personal details
- Born: Angelyne Glenda Dovo
- Education: University of the South Pacific

Angelyne Glenda Dovo Roy is a Vanuatuan lawyer and public servant. Roy was appointed as the 10th Attorney General of Vanuatu by President Nikenike Vurobaravu on 16 June 2025, becoming the first woman to serve as attorney general in the country's history. Her appointment marked major sign of progress for women in Vanuatu in the public and legal fields.

== Biography ==
Rot's family includes her late father, Willie Dovo, and her late younger brother, Wilfred Bernard. She graduated from the University of the South Pacific in December 1999 and completing a Professional Legal Practice program in Fiji soon afterwards.

She joined the staff of the Attorney General's Office in 2000. Among her accomplishments, Roy worked on the maritime boundary negotiations between Vanuatu and Fiji.

On 16 June 2025, President Nikenike Vurobaravu formally appointed Roy as the 10th Attorney General of Vanuatu, becoming the first woman to hold the position in history. In his speech, President Vurobaravu noted the historic and symbolic nature of Roy's appointment as attorney general in Vanuatu and the larger Oceania region, telling the audience, "Congratulations, Angelyne, this is truly historic...I’m not sure if it’s just in Vanuatu or the whole Pacific, but I suspect you are among the first women Attorneys General in our wide Pacific Blue Continent." Vurobaravu also said he hoped Roy would inspire other girls in Vanuatu and other Pacific island nations.

In her acceptance speech, Attorney General Roy said her appointment proves that gender should never block professional opportunities for women in Vanuatu.
