= Nkemdilim Izuako =

Nigerian judge

Member of the United Nations Dispute Tribunal
- Incumbent
- Assumed office 2009

Nkemdilim Amelia Izuako is a Nigerian judge. Since 2009, she has been one of the three judges on the United Nations Dispute Tribunal (UNDT).

Izuako received her law degree from the University of Ife. She has taught law at Nnamdi Azikiwe University and at the Gambia Technical Institute.

Izuako became a judge in 1998 when she was appointed to the courts of Anambra State; she later was appointed to the High Court of Nigeria, where she served until 2003 . From 2004 to 2006, she served as a judge on the High Court and the Court of Appeal of Gambia. In 2006, she was appointed to the High Court of Solomon Islands; she was the first female judge on the courts of the Solomon Islands. In each of these jurisdictions, and as a judge of a court of general jurisdiction, she handled labour and administrative law matters. Before moving to Solomon Islands, Justice Izuako worked for more than two decades in the Nigerian judiciary, including working with the United Nations Office on Drugs and Crime to put together a Judicial Ethics Training Manual for the Nigerian judiciary.

In 2009, she was appointed as a judge of the UNDT. At the UNDT, she is based in Nairobi, Kenya. The tribunal, which is located in Nairobi, New York and Geneva, works to improve the UN's system of dealing with internal grievances and disciplinary cases.

Outside the courtroom, Izuako worked to assist social development by mobilising local women to form the Honiara Women's Initiative, which undertakes micro-projects for the economic and social empowerment of women and girls.

== See also ==
- First women lawyers around the world
