= Harriette Vine =

New Zealand lawyer

Harriette Vine OStJ
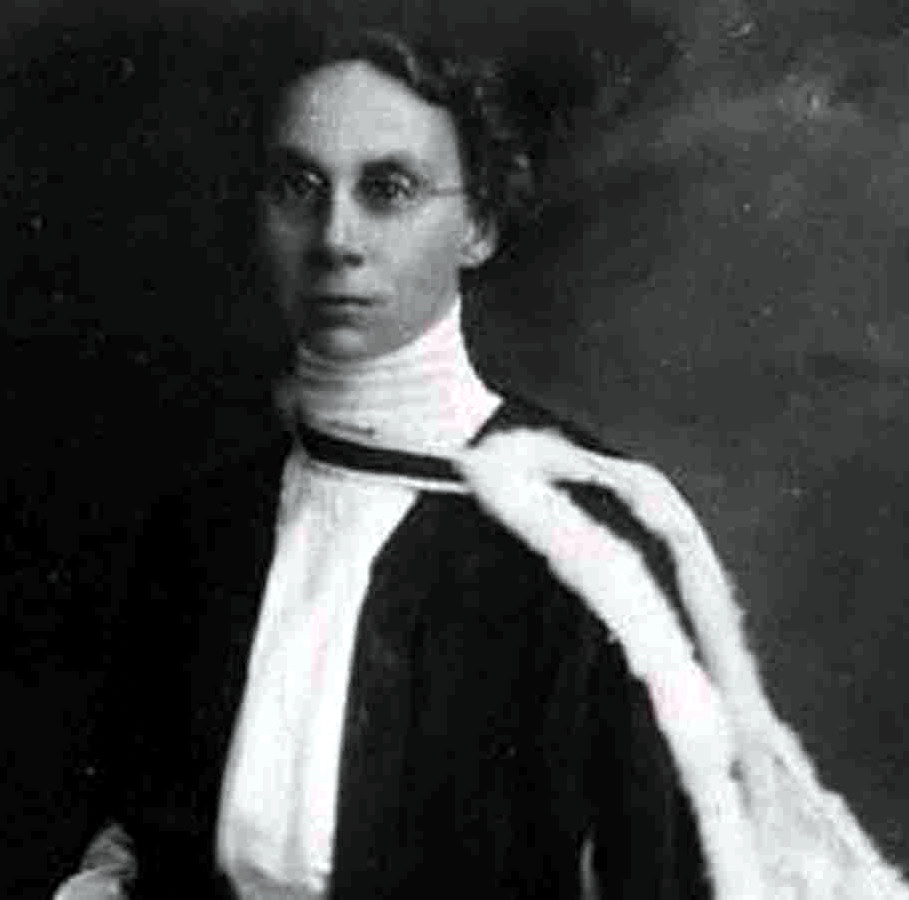
- Born: 6 April 1878; Dunedin, New Zealand
- Died: 3 September 1962 (aged 84); Whanganui, New Zealand
- Education: Victoria University College
- Occupation: Lawyer
- Known for: First woman law graduate from Victoria University College

Harriette Joanna Vine OStJ (6 April 1878 – 3 September 1962) was a New Zealand lawyer. She was the first woman to graduate with a degree in law from Victoria University College. She received a number of awards for her work with the Order of St John.

== Early life ==
Vine was born in Dunedin on 6 April 1878. Her parents were English immigrants Edward and Sarah Vine. She attended Andersons Bay School, and Otago Girls' High School. The family moved to Whanganui, and she passed the university matriculation examination in 1904.

Vine studied law at Victoria University College, graduating in 1913 with a Bachelor of Laws degree and in 1915 with a Master of Laws degree. She was the first woman to graduate in law from the university.

== Career ==
After graduating, Vine returned to Whanganui and worked as a lawyer in the firm Treadwell and Gordon, specialising in banking, trust, wills and company work. She remained with the firm for 47 years.

Vine was active in the Order of Saint John and in 1930 she was made an Officer of the Order of St John.

== Death and legacy ==
Vine died when she was hit by a car on Purnell Street, Whanganui, while walking home from work on 3 September 1962. She was 84 years old. Vine left her home to the Wanganui City Council in her will; the Harriette Vine Free Kindergarten was built on the land.

In 2014, the Wellington Women Lawyers' Association commemorated the centenary of Vine's graduation from the university with an essay competition titled Harriette's challenges 100 years on: same or different?. The Victoria University of Wellington Law Review published the two winning entries in a special issue on women in law.

== See also ==
- First women lawyers around the world
