= Jane E Crulci =

Nauru judge (born 1964)

Jane Elizabeth Crulci (born 1964, South Africa; previously Jane Hamilton-White) was a Judge of the Supreme Court of Nauru from 2014 - 2017.

== Career ==
Jane Crulci was called to the Bar at the Inner Temple in 1990 following post-graduate study at the Inns of Court School of Law, London.

Jane Crulci has worked in seven Commonwealth countries as a barrister, in Law and Justice sector development and in the judiciary.

Her experience over three decades includes prosecuting criminal matters in post-conflict environments (Crown Prosecution Service, UK; DPP and CDPP, Queensland, Australia; Fiji DPP; and Solomon Islands DPP), Principal Magistrate of the Solomon Islands (c. 2003–2005), Public Solicitor of St. Helena (South Atlantic Ocean; c. 2006–2008), Justice Sector Adviser, Papua New Guinea (c.2008-2011) and Judge of the Supreme Court of Nauru (c.2014– 2017).

She was the first female Principal Magistrate to be appointed in the Solomon Islands and the first female judge to be appointed in Nauru
