= Court of Appeal of Tuvalu =

Appellate court in Tuvalu

- Established: 1978
- Jurisdiction: Tuvalu
- Location: Funafuti
- Authorised by: Constitution of Tuvalu
- Appeals to: Judicial Committee of the Privy Council
- Number of positions: 3

The Court of Appeal of Tuvalu is established by sections 137 & 138 of the Constitution of Tuvalu to hear appeals from decisions of the High Court of Tuvalu and to determine the Law of Tuvalu. The administration of the court is set out in the Superior Courts Act (1987) and in the Court of Appeal Rules (2009). The Court of Appeal of Tuvalu determined appeals for the first time in 2009. Tomkins, Fisher and Paterson JJA (judges from New Zealand) were appointed to decide two cases:

- Falefou v. Esau [2009] TVCA 1.
- Teonea v. Pule o Kaupule of Nanumaga [2009] TVCA 2.

== Falefou v. Esau ==
Falefou v. Esau was an appeal from a judgment of Donne CJ given in the High Court on 27 August 1991. Donne CJ dismissed an appeal from the Lands Appeal Panel which rejected that the appellant, who had been adopted according to native custom, was entitled to the transfer of all the lands and Pulaka pits held by the person (who died intestate), who had adopted the appellant. The Court of Appeal rejected the appeal; deciding that “The Tuvalu Land Code is a code for disposing of an intestate’s land. In the Court’s view distributions are to be made in accordance with the Code. It supersedes customary law. Section 5(2) of the laws of Tuvalu Court provide that customary law does not take effect if it is inconsistent with an Act. In this instance the customary law is inconsistent with the Tuvalu Land Code.”

== Teonea v. Pule o Kaupule of Nanumaga ==
Teonea v. Pule o Kaupule of Nanumaga was an appeal from a judgment of Ward CJ given in the High Court on 11 October 2005. The case raised issues in relation to the balancing the freedoms of religion, expression and association that are set out in the Constitution of Tuvalu against the values of Tuvaluan culture and social stability that are also referred to in the Constitution. The dispute arose in July 2003 when the Falekaupule (the traditional assembly of elders) of Nanumaga passed a resolution that had the effect of banning the Brethren Church from seeking converts in Nanumaga. The Falekaupule had decided that the preaching of the Brethren Church was causing division in the Nanumaga community.

Mase Teonea, a pastor in the Brethren Church, sought a declaration that the resolution of the Falekaupule was null and void as contrary to the Constitution, in that the resolution was contrary to: section 23(1) of the Constitution of Tuvalu 1986 as it hinders freedom of belief and worship; section 24(1) and 25(1) in so far that it limited the freedom of expression, and freedom of association of the church members; and that the resolution was discriminatory and contrary to section 27(1) in so far that it treated the applicant in a way that gives him and his church congregation less favourable treatment than other such groups and persons. The judgement of Ward CJ balanced the freedoms of religion, expression and association against the values of Tuvaluan stability and culture, with the Chief Justice accepting the evidence of the unrest and tension on Nanumaga. The decision of the Chief Justice was to refuse to grant the declaration sought by Mase Teonea.

The approach to the constitutional questions that the Court of Appeal should take was described by Paterson JA who stated:

“it is my view that it is for the Court to determine whether the circumstances are such that it is necessary to regulate or place some restriction on the exercise of the rights at issue in this case. The balancing act requires a consideration of the importance of the freedoms in question and whether it is necessary to regulate or place some restrictions on the exercise of those freedoms if the exercise:

[a] may be divisive, unsettling or offensive to the people; or

[b] may directly threaten Tuvaluan values or culture.

Section 29(5) of the Constitution makes it clear that a restriction may be lawful even if it restricts religious freedom, if the exercise of the rights would lead to the results specified in section 29(4). This provision is subject to sections 12 and 15 which provides that any restriction must be reasonably justifiable in a democratic society that has a proper respect for human rights and dignity when considered in the light of the circumstances existing at the time.”

The majority judgments of Fisher and Paterson JJA allowed the appeal, so that the judgment of the Chief Justice was set aside. The Court of Appeal made the declaration that the resolution of the Falekaupule of 4 July 2003 was contrary to the Constitution. Tomkins JA provided a minority opinion in which he agreed with the decision of the Chief Justice and would have dismissed the appeal.

== Appeals to the Judicial Committee of the Privy Council ==
Section 139 of the Constitution of Tuvalu establishes that in respect of decisions of the Court of Appeal there is a right of appeal to His Majesty the King in Council, i.e., the Privy Council in London.

No appeals have yet been made to the Privy Council from Tuvalu, but this remains as an option.
