= Anjala Wati =

Fijian judge

Justice of the Supreme Court of Fiji
- Incumbent
- Assumed office 19 August 2016

Personal details
- Education: University of the South Pacific

Anjala Wati is a Fijian lawyer and judge. She became the first woman appointed as a justice of the Supreme Court of Fiji in 2016, having previously served as a judge of the High Court of Fiji.

== Career ==
Wati earned a law degree from the University of the South Pacific and was admitted to the bar in 1999. She practised law in Labasa and taught at the Pacific Training Centre in New Zealand for one year. She later served as a court clerk in the Family Division of the High Court of Fiji before being appointed a judge in the Family Division for Suva, Nausori and Nasinu. In 2009, she was appointed a puisne judge.

In 2009, Wati was granted a visa to travel to New Zealand with her son, who required urgent eye surgery. The initial refusal of the visa was reportedly believed to be linked to her judicial position, leading to a diplomatic dispute between Fiji and New Zealand. The visa was later granted on humanitarian grounds to allow her son to receive medical treatment.

On 19 August 2016, Wati was sworn in as the first female justice of the Supreme Court of Fiji by Fijian president Jioji Konrote.
