= High Court of Tuvalu =

Court in Tuvalu

- Established: 1978
- Jurisdiction: Tuvalu
- Location: Funafuti
- Authorised by: Constitution of Tuvalu
- Appeals to: Court of Appeal of Tuvalu
- Number of positions: 3

Chief Justice
- Currently: John Muria (Acting)
- Since: 21 December 2024

The High Court of Tuvalu is the superior court of Tuvalu. It has unlimited original jurisdiction to determine the Law of Tuvalu and hears appeals from the lower courts.

== General jurisdiction of the High Court ==
The High Court of Tuvalu has general jurisdiction and responsibility, as authorised by sections 122 to 136 of the Constitution of Tuvalu. The jurisdiction of the High Court extends over both criminal and civil matters, and deals with cases at first instance or on appeal from the lower courts. The administration of the court is set out in Superior Courts Act (1987) and the admiralty jurisdiction is addressed in the Admiralty Jurisdiction (Tuvalu) Order (1975).

== Lower courts ==
There are eight Island Courts and Lands Courts; appeals in relation to land disputes are made to the Lands Courts Appeal Panel. Appeals from the Island Courts and the Lands Courts Appeal Panel are made to the Magistrates Court, which has jurisdiction to hear civil cases involving up to $10,000.

== Jurisdiction of the High Court in constitutional matters ==
Section 5 of the Constitution establishes the jurisdiction of the High Court in constitutional matters; with sections 40 to 42 confirming the jurisdiction of the High Court to determine questions in relation to the Bill of Rights is set out in Part II of the Constitution.

Amasone v. Attorney General was a judgment of Ward CJ delivered on 6 August 2003. Amasone Kilei, the leader of the opposition, requested an order regarding the calling of parliament. The Chief Justice delivered directions as to how the governor-general should proceed to take any action he considers to be appropriate under Section 116(1) of the Constitution, acting in his own deliberate judgment, rather than as advised by the cabinet. That is, the governor-general could consider whether it was appropriate to exercise his reserve powers in calling parliament.

Teonea v. Pule o Kaupule of Nanumaga was a judgment of Ward CJ given delivered 11 October 2005. The case raised issues in relation to the balancing the freedoms of religion, expression and association that are set out in the Constitution of Tuvalu against the values of Tuvaluan culture and social stability that are also referred to in the Constitution. This matter went on appeal to the Court of Appeal of Tuvalu.

== Chief Justice of Tuvalu ==
Sir (Dermot) Renn Davis (1928-1997), who had previously served in Kenya and then as the British Judge in the New Hebrides Condominium (now Vanuatu) 1973-1976, and as the first Chief Justice of Solomon Islands in 1976 and as Chief Justice of Gibraltar (1980-1986), was Chief Justice of Tuvalu from 1978 to 1980 and then Chief Justice of the Falkland Islands and a Judge of Appeal of Gibraltar. He died, on his way to a Mozart festival in Leipzig, Germany aged 68 in 1997.

The Hon Sir Gaven Donne KBE, (1914-2010) was Chief Justice 1985-2001, retired at the age of 85 and died aged 95 in 2010.

The Hon Sir Gordon Ward OBE, Chief Justice of Tuvalu (2000-2016), was a President of the Court of Appeal of Fiji, and Chief Justice of Tonga and of Trinidad and Tobago. In May 2013 Sir Gordon Ward ruled on the application of the Tuvaluan Opposition regarding the calling of a by-election for the vacant seat in Nukufetau, which led to the 2013 Nukufetau by-election.

The Hon Charles Sweeney QC was appointed Chief Justice in early 2016. Following the election of Kausea Natano as prime minister following the 2019 Tuvaluan general election, the justice minister, Simon Kofe, announced a two-member tribunal to investigate Mr Sweeney on allegations of judicial misconduct.

The Hon Sir Gordon Ward was appointed as acting Chief Justice, pending the appeal by the Hon Charles Sweeney QC against the termination of his appointment by a resolution of the Parliament.

The Hon. Sir John Muria was appointed as a judge of the High Court of Tuvalu in 2021. He was appointed as Acting Chief Justice on 21 December 2024, succeeding Sir Gordon Ward in the role.

=== List of chief justices ===
Chief Justice	Term of office	Notes
Sir Dermot Renn Davis	1978–1980	
Sir Gaven Donne	1985–2001	
Sir Gordon Ward	2001–2016	
Charles Sweeney	2016–2019	
Sir Gordon Ward (acting)	2019–2024	
Sir John Muria (acting)	2024–present	

== Judges of the High Court of Tuvalu ==
The Hon. Robin Millhouse QC, a Chief Justice of Kiribati for 16 years and before that (1982-1999) a judge of the Supreme Court of South Australia and eventually its senior puisne judge, an Attorney General of South Australia and a member of its Parliament for more than 25 years, served as a Judge of the High Court of Tuvalu from 2014. He died, aged 87, on 27 April 2017. Plenus annis, plenus honoribus.

The Hon Justice Michael Finnane RFD QC served as a Judge of the High Court of Tuvalu in 2017.

In 2021, Sir John Baptist Muria was appointed as a judge of the High Court of Tuvalu.

== Court of Appeal of Tuvalu ==
Most rulings of the High Court can be appealed to the Court of Appeal of Tuvalu.
