= Mele Tuilotolava =

Tongan-New Zealand lawyer

Mele Tuilotolava, also known as Mary, is a Tongan-New Zealand lawyer. She was the first Pasifika New Zealander to graduate in law from a New Zealand university.

Tuilotolava graduated in law in 1982. In 1989 she opened her own legal practice in Manukau, Auckland, focusing on family court work and representing children in matters related to their care and protection, justice and guardianship. One of her more high-profile cases was in 2009, when she was the defence lawyer for Lisa Kuka during her trial for the neglect of daughter Nia Glassie.

Tuilotolava has also been active in mental health related issues. She has been a member of the National Ethics Committee for Health and Disability and was a Trustee of Ta Pasefika Primary Health Organisation, a major provider of health services in South Auckland and Auckland. until 2010.

Tuilotolava was a member of the Pacific Peoples Focus Group at the Ministry of Justice for three years, finishing in 2002. She has provided legal clinics at the Mangere Citizens’ Advice Bureau and on radio talkback shows. She is active in the Auckland District Law Society and is a member of the Pacific Lawyers Association and Manukau Lawyers Association.

Tuilotolava has also been involved in a number of other Pasifika community groups including the National Council of Tongan Women, the Tongan Women's Association, and the Auckland Pacific Island Community Radio Trust.
