= Rachel Subusola Olutimayin =

First female Director of Public Prosecutions in the Solomon Islands

- Born: Nigeria
- Known for: Director of Public Prosecutions
- Predecessor: Ronald Bei Talasasa
- Successor: Andrew. E. Kelesi

Rachel Subusola Olutimayin was the first woman to be the Director of Public Prosecutions in the Solomon Islands. She was born in Nigeria but her nationality was Fijian.

== Life ==
Olutimayin was born in Nigeria but her nationality was Fijian and she gives her residence as Canada.

She came to the Solomon Islands in 2003 as part of the Regional Assistance Mission to the Solomon Islands. She worked for the Islands' public solicitor and for the Director of Public Prosecutions. In 2009 she was employed by the University of the South Pacific as a senior lecturer while supplying her expertise to settling difficult cases.

In 2019, Olutimayin took over from Ronald Bei Talasasa who had been the country's Director of Public Prosecutions. Ethel Sigimanu who was the ministry of justice's permanent secretary gave her the contract and she noted the significance of her appointment as the first woman DPP. She was sworn in as the DPP by the Governor General David Vunagi.

She was part of continued efforts to remove the gender bias in the Solomon Islands' justice system. This idea received support from Australia and the United Nations. Studies had shown that women in the Solomon Islands were not contributing to the economy because of "domestic and sexual violence, bullying, and sexual harassment". Sally-Anne Vincent, then deputy High Commissioner, said in 2021 that the government had seen how this discrimination affected their country.

In September 2023, her term as Director of Public Prosecutions came to an end and she was replaced by Andrew. E. Kelesi who had served as her deputy.
