= Law of Tuvalu =

The Law of Tuvalu comprises the legislation voted into law by the Parliament of Tuvalu and statutory instruments that become law; certain acts passed by the Parliament of the United Kingdom (during the time Tuvalu was either a British protectorate or British colony); the common law; and customary law (particularly in relation to the ownership of land). The land tenure system is largely based on kaitasi (extended family ownership).

== The Constitution ==
The Constitution of Tuvalu states that it is "the supreme law of Tuvalu" and that "all other laws shall be interpreted and applied subject to this Constitution"; it sets out the Principles of the Bill of Rights and the Protection of the Fundamental Rights and Freedoms.

== Laws of Tuvalu Act 1987 ==
By virtue of section 42(2) of the Laws of Tuvalu Act 1987, the Law of Tuvalu includes customary law. Schedule 1 paragraph 3 and 4 of the Laws of Tuvalu Act 1987 require that courts must take customary law into account when considering specified matters in criminal and civil proceedings.

The law that existed at the time of independence is preserved in Schedule 5 sections 1 and 2 of the Constitution as “any Acts of the Parliament of the United Kingdom, Orders of Her Majesty in Council, Ordinances, rules, regulations, orders or other instruments having effect as part of the law of Tuvalu”, subject to these laws not being in conflict with any provisions in the Constitution. This provision is reinforced by the Laws of Tuvalu Act 1987: “An Act to declare what constitutes the Laws of Tuvalu”.

Section 4 of the Laws of Tuvalu Act 1987 describes the laws as being derived from: the Constitution, the law enacted by the Parliament of Tuvalu, customary law, the common law of Tuvalu and every applied law. ‘Applied law’ is defined in section 7 of that act as “imperial enactments which have effect as part of the law of Tuvalu”.

== Imperial enactments ==
The laws of Tuvalu include some statutes from the 1892 to 1916 era when the islands were under the jurisdiction of the Western Pacific High Commission (the ‘Western Pacific Legislation’); other laws were enacted by the Parliament of the United Kingdom during the time the islands were administered as part of the Gilbert and Ellice Islands Colony (from 1916 to 1974); and the during the time of the Colony of Tuvalu (from 1 January 1976 to 1 October 1978 - prior to independence).

== Current laws of Tuvalu ==
The laws of Tuvalu are published online by the Office of the Attorney General of Tuvalu; also by the Pacific Islands Legal Information Institute, with the law set out in the 2008 Revised Edition; with a list of current legislation (up to 2012).

== Attorney General of Tuvalu ==
According to a 2003 source, the Attorney General of Tuvalu "is the principal adviser to the Government." The Attorney General is considered a public officer, though not a Member of Parliament or a Minister. While the Attorney General does sit in Parliament in a legal advising capacity and may partake in proceedings that align with the Parliamentary Rules of Procedure, s/he does not have any voting rights. Upon request, the Attorney General may advise "Statutory Corporations and Local Governments."

Attorney General of Tuvalu (Complete Table)
Name	Term
John Wilson (who established the office) Neil Davidson Beith Atkinson	c. 1978-1988 (in succession)
David Ballantyne	1988-1991
Feleti Teo (1st Tuvaluan male)	c. 1991-2000
Iakoba Italeli*	c. 2002-2006
Eselealofa Apinelu* (1st Tuvaluan female)	c. 2008-2022
Laingane Italeli Talia	c. 2022 - present

*The Attorney General served as the Acting Attorney General for years before their final appointment.

== Office of Director of Public Prosecutions ==
The office of Director of Public Prosecutions is established as an office in the Public Service in section 162(1) of the Constitution. The role of the Director of Public Prosecutions includes instituting and undertaking criminal proceedings against any person before any court (other than a court-martial or other military tribunal) for any criminal offence (section 162(4)(a)).

== Judiciary ==
Courts are established in Tuvalu to resolve disputes and to interpret the laws of Tuvalu. There are eight Island Courts and Lands Courts; appeals in relation to land disputes are made to the Lands Courts Appeal Panel. Appeals from the Island Courts and the Lands Courts Appeal Panel are made to the Magistrates Court, which has jurisdiction to hear civil cases involving up to $10,000. The superior court is the High Court of Tuvalu as it has unlimited original jurisdiction and hears appeals from the lower courts.

Rulings of the High Court can be appealed to the Court of Appeal of Tuvalu. From the Court of Appeal there is a right of appeal to the Judicial Committee of the Privy Council in London.

The 2023 amendments to the Constitution changed the eligibility for the position of a High Court Judge. The previous version of the Constitution required that any person holding that position must have first held judicial office in “some country that has a legal system similar to that of Tuvalu”. The 2023 amendments now provide that a Tuvaluan who has practiced as barrister or solicitor in Tuvalu or has been appointed a magistrate in Tuvalu, is now eligible to be appointed as a judge of the High Court of Tuvalu.

The People's Lawyer represents clients for free in cases involving land disputes, civil disputes, criminal law, family law and business formation.

== Human rights in Tuvalu ==
Tuvalu is a state party to the following human rights treaties: the Convention on the Rights of the Child (CRC); the Convention on the Elimination of all forms of Discrimination Against Women (CEDAW) and; the Convention on the Rights of Persons with Disabilities (CRPD). Tuvalu has commitments to ensuring human rights are respected under the Universal periodic Review (UPR), the Sustainable Development Goals (SDGs) and the Te Kakeega III - National Strategy for Sustainable Development-2016-2020 (TK III), which sets out the development agenda of the Government of Tuvalu.

== See also ==
- Crime in Tuvalu
- Justice ministry
- Law enforcement in Tuvalu
- Politics of Tuvalu
