= Gordon Ward (judge) =

British judge

Sir Frederik Gordon Roy Ward OBE is a retired British judge who has served in various countries of the Commonwealth.

== Early life ==
He was educated in England, obtaining a BSc in botany, zoology and geology, and then taught biology in Northern Ireland.

== Career ==
Ward studied law and was called to the bar at the Middle Temple and practiced from chambers in London for 12 years.

In 1979 he went to the South Pacific, where he first worked in Fiji for six and a half years. He then served as a judge on the Court of Appeal of Solomon Islands where, from circa 1988 to 1992, he was Chief Justice. He then moved to Tonga to become Chief Justice of Tonga and a judge of the Supreme Court of Tonga. In 1995 he moved to serve as a judge in Cyprus before returning in 1998 to serve a second term as Chief Justice of Tonga, resigning in 2004 in protest at attempts to ban the Times of Tonga newspaper, a paper unsympathetic to the government, a move which he considered to be unconstitutional.

On leaving this post he took up a new position as the President of the Appeal Court of Fiji. In 2007, following the December 2006 military coup, Ward and five other judges resigned as judges of the courts of Fiji.

He was the Chief Justice of the Turks and Caicos Islands from 2008 to 2012 and was knighted in the 2012 New Year Honours for services to the judiciary in the Turks and Caicos Islands and the Commonwealth.

Ward was the Chief Justice of the High Court of Tuvalu from 2001 to 2016. In May 2013 the Chief Justice ruled on the application of the Tuvaluan Opposition regarding the calling of a by-election for the vacant seat in Nukufetau, which led to the 2013 Nukufetau by-election. The Chief Justice was forced to conduct the legal proceedings by email as a consequence of being unable to travel from New Zealand to Tuvalu via Fiji as the Fijian regime refused to provide Sir Gordon Ward with a visa that allowed him to travel from New Zealand to Fiji and then to transit to Tuvalu.

In 2019 he was appointed as acting Chief Justice of Tuvalu, pending the appeal by the Hon Charles Sweeney QC against the termination of his appointment by a resolution of the Parliament.
