= Judiciary of Solomon Islands =

Branch of the Government of Solomon Islands

The judiciary of Solomon Islands is a branch of the Government of Solomon Islands that interprets and applies the laws of Solomon Islands, to ensure equal justice under law, and to provide a mechanism for dispute resolution. The legal system is derived from chapter VII, part II of the Constitution, adopted when the country became independent from the United Kingdom in 1978. The Constitution provided for the creation of a High Court, with original jurisdiction in civil and criminal cases, and a Court of Appeal. It also provided for the possibility of "subordinate courts", with no further specification (art.84).

The court system is under the responsibility of the Minister for Justice and Legal Affairs, who as of June 2013 is Commins Mewa.

Prior to the beginning of the international Regional Assistance Mission to Solomon Islands (RAMSI) in 2003, designed to restore peace and order in the country and reinforce its institutions, the "justice system was barely functioning, with courts rarely sitting and those awaiting trial often waiting more than two years for their case to be heard". The judiciary was strengthened over the following years, and as of 2013 RAMSI maintains "19 long-term advisers supporting the Solomon Islands judicial system".

Like that of most Pacific island countries, Solomon Islands' court system relies partly on foreign judges, from other common law countries. Thus, the judges of the Court of Appeal "include senior judges from Australia, New Zealand and Papua New Guinea". Foreign judges are also found in the High Court.

The court system at present is structured as follows.

== Local courts ==
Local courts have both civil and criminal jurisdiction when all parties live within the area under that jurisdiction. Rulings are issued not by professional judges but by community elders, applying customary law and local by-laws. Sentences passed in criminal cases may not exceed six months imprisonment, nor a fine of SI$ 200. A case may only be brought to a local court once "all traditional means of resolving the dispute have been exhausted", and the case has been submitted to local chiefs without the latter's ruling being satisfactory to all parties.

Appeals from a local court are heard by a magistrate's court, or by the Customary Land Appeal Court if the dispute relates to customary land.

== Customary Land Appeal Court ==
The Customary Land Appeal Court hears only cases relating to the use and ownership of indigenous customary land, on appeal from a local court. It applies customary law. Appeals from this court are possible only on a point of law, and are heard by the High Court.

== Magistrates' courts ==
Magistrates' courts have both civil and criminal jurisdiction, in limited types of cases. Civil cases in contract or tort may only be heard in the magistrates' court if the value of the claim does not exceed SI$6,000. The maximum sentence imposable in criminal cases is fourteen years' imprisonment. The court has both original and appellate jurisdiction, hearing appeals from local courts. Appeals from the magistrates' court are heard by the High Court.

== High Court ==
The High Court has "unlimited original civil and criminal jurisdiction" (in more serious cases), and appellate jurisdiction, hearing appeals from the magistrates' courts and from the Customary Land Appeal Court (on points of law only for the latter). The High Court's rulings on appeal from the Customary Land Appeal Court are final. Other High Court rulings are subject to appeal to the Court of Appeal.

The court is presided by the Chief Justice, and is composed of puisne judges. As of 2013, the Chief Justice is Sir Albert Rocky Palmer.

Previous Chief Justices have included Renn Davis, appointed the first Chief Justice of the Solomon Islands in 1976, Sir Frederik Gordon Ward, who left the Solomon Islands in 1992 to become Chief Justice of Tonga and John Baptiste Muria who held the post from 1992 to 2003.

=== List of chief justices ===
- 1976–1979: Dermot Renn Davis
- 1979-1980: Frederick George Cooke
- 1980-1984: Francis Lenton Daly
- ca. 1988-1992: Sir Gordon Ward
- 1992–2003: Sir Gilbert John Baptist Muria
- 2004-: Sir Albert Rocky Palmer

== Court of Appeal ==
The Court of Appeal is the country's supreme court. It has appellate jurisdiction only, hearing appeals from the High Court.

The court is presided by the President of the Court of Appeal. In addition to High Court judges, who sit in the Court of Appeal ex officio, the Court of Appeal includes Justices of Appeal. As of 2011, the President of the Court of Appeal is Sir Robin Auld (an English judge). From March 2014, Justice Edwin Goldsbrough served as the President of the Court of Appeal for Solomon Islands. Justice Goldsbrough has previously served a five-year terms as a Judge of the High Court of Solomon Islands (2006–2011). Justice Edwin Goldsbrough then served as the Chief Justice of the Turks and Caicos Islands. Since November 2023, Sir John Baptist Muria has served as the President of the Court of Appeal of Solomon Islands. Sir John Baptist Muria previously served as the former Chief Justice of Solomon Islands.

The Constitution theoretically provided for special leave to appeal to the Judicial Committee of the Privy Council based in the United Kingdom assuming that the Queen of Solomon Islands had jurisdiction, notwithstanding that the Court of Appeal Ordinance at the independence of Solomon Islands in 1978, established the Solomon Islands Court of Appeal. That remained the case until this avenue was effectively extinguished by the judgement of the Privy Council in Bade vs The Queen (of Solomon Islands) 8 June 2016, although this could, at least in theory, be reversed.

== Public Solicitor of Solomon Islands ==
The Public Solicitor was established by Section 92 of the Constitution of Solomon Islands 1978 which mandates that the officeholder must be a barrister, solicitor or advocate that is entitled to practice law in Solomon Islands. The Public Solicitor provides legal assistance to individuals that fall within the circumstances as prescribed by the Parliament. For instance, the Public Solicitor provides legal aid to those charged with a criminal offense or as ordered by the High Court.

According to Stand Up and Fight Addressing Discrimination and Inequality in Solomon Islands (The Equal Rights Trust Country Report Series, 2016), the Public Solicitor's Office was not actually established until the Public Solicitor Act (1987). Beforehand, starting in the late 1970s, any legal services were provided by the Social Welfare Solicitors office located within the Honiara City Council's headquarters. Initially, the Public Solicitor's Office was staffed by lawyers from the Voluntary Service Overseas project that had worked for the Social Welfare Solicitors. The volunteer lawyers were eventually joined by Solomon Islands law graduates. The Public Solicitor's office has three locations: Honiara (which is the only office that has a Family Protection Unit), Gizo and Auki.

Public Solicitor of Solomon Islands (Incomplete Table)
Name	Term
Kenneth Brown (1st to serve in the role)	c. 1982-1988
Patrick Lavery	c. 1993–2002
Ken Averre	c. 2003–2008
Douglas Hou	c. 2009–2018
Howard Lawry	c. 2019–2020
George Gray	c. 2020–
