= Constitution of Tuvalu =

The Constitution of Tuvalu states that it is “the supreme law of Tuvalu” and that “all other laws shall be interpreted and applied subject to this Constitution”; it sets out the Principles of the Bill of Rights and the Protection of the Fundamental Rights and Freedoms.

Tuvalu's independence was granted to it by the United Kingdom by virtue of the Tuvalu Independence Order 1978 (UK). Tuvalu became an independent constitutional monarchy on 1 October 1978. Charles III – as the King of Tuvalu – is the Head of State, represented by the Governor-General, who is appointed by the King on advice of the Prime Minister of Tuvalu. A written constitution was adopted at independence. In 1986 Tuvalu approved a new constitution that had been developed by the community leaders and the members of the Tuvaluan parliament. In May 2018 a translation of the current Constitution into the Tuvaluan language was completed as part of the Tuvalu Constitutional Review Project.

== History of political institutions in Tuvalu ==
Tuvaluans participated in the political institutions of the Gilbert and Ellice Islands Colony during the transition to self-determination. In 1974 the Gilbert and Ellice Islands Colony acquired its own constitution. A referendum was held in December 1974 to determine whether the Gilbert Islands and Ellice Islands should each have their own administration. As a consequence of the 1974 Ellice Islands self-determination referendum the Gilbert and Ellice Islands colony ceased to exist on 1 January 1976 and the separate British colonies of Kiribati and Tuvalu came into existence.

=== The Constitution adopted on independence ===
Tuvalu became fully independent within the Commonwealth on 1 October 1978 with a written constitution. John F. Wilson, as Attorney-General, advised on the transition of Tuvalu to independence including attending the Constitutional Conference in Marlborough House in London and visiting each island of Tuvalu to explain the Constitution.

=== Amending the Constitution and referendums in Tuvalu ===
Section 7 provides for alterations of the Constitution generally and section 8 addresses alterations of the Constitution to give effect to constitutional changes in the United Kingdom.

In 2008 Tuvaluans rejected a constitutional referendum that proposed replacing the Queen of Tuvalu, with an elected president as the Head of State.

=== The 1986 amendments to the Constitution ===
In 1986 the Constitution adopted upon independence was amended in order to give attention to Tuvaluan custom and tradition as well as the aspirations and values of the Tuvaluan people. The changes placed greater emphasis on Tuvaluan community values rather than Western concepts of individual entitlement. The preamble was changed and an introductory ‘Principles of the Constitution’ was added.

The Principles make frequent reference to Tuvaluan values, culture, custom and tradition and draw attention to the importance of the Christian religion to Tuvaluan society.

=== The 2010 amendments to the Constitution ===
The Constitution (Recognition of Traditional Standards, Values and Practices) Amendment Act 2010, had the stated purposes of:

1. to protect the island communities of Tuvalu from the spread of religious beliefs which threaten the cohesiveness of island communities.
2. to provide the powers necessary to make laws to restrict the exercise of certain constitutional freedoms, where the exercise of those freedoms is inconsistent with a law, or an act done under law, which accords with the traditional standards, values and practices of the island communities of Tuvalu.
3. to provide legal recognition for the traditional practices of island communities to limit the establishment of religions on their islands.

=== The Tuvalu Constitutional Review Project 2016–2023 ===
In 2016 a review of the Constitution of Tuvalu commenced. The Tuvalu Constitutional Review Project was implemented by the United Nations Development Programme (UNDP) and the Government of Tuvalu. The project reviewed executive/parliamentary relations and Tuvalu's commitments under international law. The project considered the country's socio-economic and political context, such as the sensitivities over political and religious diversity among Tuvalu's Christian and religious minorities.

In July 2020 the Parliament of Tuvalu adopted a Motion to establish: “a constitution select committee that would monitor in ensuring that the constitution plans for the review are observed”. The MPs appointed to the committee were: Hon. Minister Simon Kofe (Chair), Hon. Minister Seve Paeniu, Hon. Minister Isaia Taape, Rt. Hon. MP Enele Sopoaga, and Hon. MP Dr. Puakena Boreham. The Attorney General was appointed as the adviser to the committee.

The Final Report of the Constitutional Review Parliamentary Select Committee was published on 12 December 2022. on the same date the Constitution of Tuvalu Bill 2022 was published. The Select Committee received advice from experts in constitutional law, including Prof. Tom Ginsburg, of the University of Chicago and a specialist in comparative constitutional law.

On 5 September 2023, Tuvalu's parliament passed the Constitution of Tuvalu Act 2023, with the changes to the Constitution coming into effect on 1 October 2023.

== Constitution of Tuvalu Act 2023 ==
Simon Kofe, the Chair of the Constitutional Review Parliamentary Select Committee, summarised the changes to the Constitution as focussing on the climate crisis and recognition of Tuvalu's statehood, enhancing the stability of governance, judicial reforms, and rights and culture.

=== The climate crisis and recognition of Tuvalu's statehood ===
The 2023 amendments to the Constitution adopt an innovative approach to determining the boundaries of the State of Tuvalu. Section 2(1) states the perpetual statehood of Tuvalu “not with standing the impacts of climate change or other causes resulting in loss to the physical territory of Tuvalu”.

Section 2(2) recognises the threat of climate change, and declares Tuvalu's area, including maritime zones (as defined in a schedule that is a Declaration of Tuvalu Geographical Coordinates) are permanent, regardless of any effects resulting from climate change.

Section 2(3) states: “The baseline coordinates declared by Schedule 6 shall remain unchanged, notwithstanding any regression of the low water mark or changes in geographical features of coasts or islands, due to sea-level rise or other causes, until and unless otherwise prescribed by an Act of Parliament.”

Section 2(7) states: “The intent for perpetual Statehood prescribed in subsection (1) and the area of Tuvalu defined in subsection (2) constitutes the sovereign will of the people of Tuvalu.”

The government of Tuvalu recognises that there is no international conventions that it can rely on that can recognise Tuvalu's new status as the effects of climate change are not addressed in the UN Convention on the Law of the Sea. Tuvalu, and other Pacific Ocean countries, support such a position on the impact on territorial boundaries caused by climate change. The leaders of the Pacific Islands Forum countries published a declaration on 6 August 2021 that recalling that Pacific Islands Forum Members have a long history of support for the United Nations Convention on the Law of the Sea (the “Convention”), and which declaration ended with a proclamation: “that our maritime zones, as established and notified to the Secretary-General of the United Nations in accordance with the Convention, and the rights and entitlements that flow from them, shall continue to apply, without reduction, notwithstanding any physical changes connected to climate change-related sea-level rise.”

=== Enhancing the stability of governance ===
The 2023 amendments to the Constitution set out provisions related to: meetings of Parliament (section 119); the prorogation of Parliament (section 120); and the dissolution of Parliament (Section 121).

The 2023 amendments to the Constitution set out provisions that are intended to enhance the oversight role of parliament over the executive government by requiring parliament to meet twice in 12 months. Members of Parliament also have the power to request that parliament sessions are held if sessions are not held at the prescribed times, when half or more of the members make a request.

In order to maintain the continuity of stable government, a vote of no confidence cannot occur in the first 12 months following an election or the last 12 months of a parliamentary term.

Changes to enhance overall parliamentary efficacy are achieved by defining the function and term of a caretaker government have been clarified; and enhanced provisions were introduced for recalling incapacitated members of parliament, such as resulting from serious medical conditions or other causes of incapacity.

=== Judicial reforms ===
The reforms to the judiciary change the eligibility for the position of High Court Judge. The 1986 version of the Constitution required that any person holding that position must have first held judicial office in “some country that has a legal system similar to that of Tuvalu”. The 2023 amendments now provide that a Tuvaluan who has practiced as barrister or solicitor in Tuvalu or has been appointed a magistrate in Tuvalu, is now eligible to be appointed as a judge of the High Court of Tuvalu.

=== Balancing human rights and Tuvaluan culture and Christian values ===
The 2023 amendments to the Constitution balances Christian values, Tuvaluan values or culture, and also human rights recognised by international treaties and conventions, such as constitutional prohibitions on discrimination against people with disabilities and on the grounds of sex to provide greater protections for women.

The Preamble to the Constitution, now includes a declaration that Tuvalu is a Christian nation founded on Christian principles. Section 29(1)) states the values that are recognised:

1. The Preamble acknowledges that Tuvalu is an Independent State based on Christian principles; Tuvaluan values, culture and tradition; the Rule of Law; and respect for human dignity.
2. This includes recognition of –
  1. the right to worship, or not to worship, in whatever way the conscience of the individual tells him; and
  2. the right to hold, to receive and to communicate opinions, ideas and information.
3. Within Tuvalu, the freedoms of the individual can only be exercised having regard to the rights of other people, the Charter of Duties and Responsibilities in section 43, and to the effect on society.
4. It may therefore be necessary in certain circumstances to regulate or place some restrictions on the exercise of those rights, if their exercise –
  1. may be divisive, unsettling or offensive to the people; or
  2. may directly threaten Tuvaluan values or culture.

The 2023 amendments to the Constitution provide for the protection of Tuvaluan values in the statement of the ‘Principles of the Constitution’ and in (section 29), including the recognition of the Falekaupule, which are the traditional governing authorities of Tuvalu's eight islands.

The 2023 amendments to the Constitution also balance rights with duties and responsibilities of Tuvaluans. Section 43 of the amended Constitution states: “There shall be a Charter of Duties and Responsibilities as contained in subsection (2) which shall declare the core values of Tuvaluan society in accordance with the principles of the Preamble and shall declare the fundamental duties and responsibilities of Tuvaluans in relation to themselves, their families, the community and the State”.

The statement in section 43, of the fundamental duties and responsibilities of Tuvaluans to themselves, their dependents, and others, includes: “to respect society, communities, islands, leaders, and cultural practices and norms; to know their duties and roles in society despite different religious beliefs and practices, to participate in and contribute to Island Communities; to work towards their own improvement, to live and work in peace and harmony with others and to use rights in a way that will not harm others.” (Section 43(2)(a)).

== Sections of the Constitution ==
=== Bill of Rights ===
Part I, Section 3 of the Constitution states that it is “the supreme law of Tuvalu” and that “all other laws shall be interpreted and applied subject to this Constitution”. Section 15 sets out how the question whether a law is “reasonably justifiable in a democratic society” is to be addressed.

Part II of the Constitution sets out the Principles of the Bill of Rights and the Protection of the Fundamental Rights and Freedoms; with Subdivision B of Part II setting out special exceptions to those rights and freedoms. In particular Section 29 (1) refer states that the “Preamble acknowledges that Tuvalu is an Independent State based on Christian principles, the Rule of Law, Tuvaluan values, culture and tradition, and respect for human dignity.” Section 29 also describes the way in which Tuvaluan values may circumscribe freedoms of the individual to acknowledged community values.

The balancing process that is inherent in reconciling the Protection of the Fundamental Rights and Freedoms with Tuvaluan values or culture was considered, in relation to the 1986 drafting of the Constitution, in Teonea v Pule o Kaupule of Nanumaga. In that case the High Court of Tuvalu, then subsequently the Court of Appeal of Tuvalu had to determine whether the freedoms of belief (s. 23); expression (s. 24) and assembly and association (s. 25) and the freedom from discrimination (s. 27) could be restricted when the Falekaupule (the traditional assembly of elders) of Nanumaga passed a resolution that had the effect of banning the Brethren Church from seeking converts in Nanumaga. The Falekaupule were on the view that the preaching of the Brethren Church was causing division in the Nanumaga community.

Subsequently legal claims were made in the High Court with each claims arising from the problems which followed the establishment of the Brethren Church on Nanumaga. Four people from Nanumaga sued in relation to unlawful dismissal from their employment on grounds that included unlawful discrimination on the basis of religion and that their Constitutional right to freedom of belief, expression and association have been denied by the Falekaupule. Three claims were dismissed, with one plaintiff being awarded general damages and aggravated damages.

=== The Monarchy of Tuvalu and the Governor General ===
The Monarchy of Tuvalu exists in a framework of a parliamentary representative democracy. As a constitutional monarch, The King acts entirely on the advice of his Government ministers in Tuvalu. The Head of State is recognised by the Constitution, in section 51, as a symbol of the unity and identity of Tuvalu.

Tuvaluans recognise the position of Governor-General is a prestigious role, the 2023 amendments to the Constitution provides for a process for the selection of the Governor-General of Tuvalu so that the position will rotation among the eight islands of the country.”

Part IV of the Constitution confirms the Head of State of Tuvalu is the King or Queen of the United Kingdom of Great Britain and Northern Ireland and provides for the rules for succession to the Crown. The functions of the office of Head of State are set out in sections 52 to 53, with section 54 describing what could happen if there is a failure to act when "the Head of State is required by this Constitution or by or under an Act of Parliament to perform any function in accordance with the advice of any person or authority", such as the failure to acts on the advice of his Government ministers, in circumstances in which it is the constitutional convention that the Head of State is expected to act on the advice of his Government ministers.

The King's representative is the Governor General. Section 59 requires the Governor General to perform the functions of the Head of State when the Sovereign is outside Tuvalu or otherwise incapacitated.

Part V, section 62 of the Constitution describes the vesting of the executive authority:

1. The executive authority of Tuvalu is primarily vested in the Sovereign, and the Governor-General as the representative of the Sovereign.
2. The executive authority so vested in the Sovereign shall be exercised in accordance with section 53 (performance of functions by the Head of State).

The exercise of the Royal prerogative of mercy or 'Power of Mercy' to grant a pardon and the commutation of prison sentences is described in section 82 of the Constitution.

The style and title of Charles III, as Monarch of Tuvalu, is set out in Act 1 of 1987 of the Parliament of Tuvalu as being: Charles the Third, by the Grace of God, King of Tuvalu and of His other Realms and Territories, Head of the Commonwealth. Under the Constitution of Tuvalu, the oath of allegiance is a declaration of allegiance to His Majesty King Charles III, His Heirs and Successors.

=== The prime minister, cabinet and ministerial government ===
Part V, Section 63 of the Constitution of Tuvalu establishes the office of Prime Minister. Under section 64 the Prime Minister is to be elected by the members of Parliament, with section 64 to 67 describes what happens if the office of the Prime Minister becomes vacant, the removal from office of an incapacitated Prime Minister, the process for the suspension of the Prime Minister, and the effect of removal or suspension of the Prime Minister.

Part V of the Constitution establishes the executive authority of Tuvalu and confirms that while the Prime Minister is the head of government, executive power is exercised by ministerial government, with Part V, section 67 to 69 establishing the role of the cabinet.

Part V also establishes the senior civil service positions of the Secretary to Government and the Attorney-General. The role of Attorney-General is carried out by a trained lawyer employed in the public service. In Tuvalu the Attorney-General sits in Parliament, but does not vote: the parliamentary role of the Attorney-General is purely advisory.

=== Parliament of Tuvalu ===
Part VI of the Constitution describes the Electoral laws, the role of the Parliament and the manner of exercise of the law-making power. The Parliament of Tuvalu or Palamene o Tuvalu is the unicameral national legislature in Tuvalu. Tuvalu follows the Westminster system of parliamentary traditions, which are modified to suit Tuvaluan political environment. The elected members of parliament selecting the Prime Minister and the Speaker of the Parliament by secret ballot. The Speaker is the presiding officer of the parliament.

The Ministers that form the Cabinet are appointed by the Governor General on the advice of the Prime Minister.

=== The Courts of Tuvalu ===
Part VII of the Constitution establishes the judicial system of Tuvalu. The High Court of Tuvalu has general jurisdiction and responsibility, as authorised by sections 120 to 133 of the Constitution. The Court of Appeal of Tuvalu is established by sections 134 & 135 of the Constitution to hear appeals from decisions of the High Court.

The Constitution establishes that in respect of decisions of the Court of Appeal, there is a right of appeal to His Majesty in Council, i.e., the Privy Council in London.

=== The Public Service ===
Part VIII of the Constitution establishes the State Services and the general functions of the Public Service Commission. The Governor-General's power to dismiss public servants at pleasure – and the role of the Public Service Commission in the dismissal of public servants – was considered by the High Court in Toafa v Attorney-General.

=== Parliamentary responsibility for finance ===
Part IX of the Constitution establishes the office of Auditor-General and confirms parliamentary responsibility for finance and the National Budget. Section 169(1) states “the raising and spending of money by the Government (including the imposition of taxation and the raising of loans) is subject to authorization and control by Parliament, and shall be regulated by an Act of Parliament.”

== Tuvalu as a parliamentary democracy ==
The role of the member of the Parliament of Tuvalu in the parliamentary democracy established in the Constitution, and the ability of a Falekaupule to direct an MP as to their conduct as a member, was considered in Nukufetau v Metia. The Falekaupule of Nukufetau directed Lotoala Metia, the elected member of parliament, as to which group of members he should join and when this directive was not followed the Falekaupule ordered Metia to resign as a member of parliament. When the Falekaupule attempted to enforce these directives through legal action, the High Court determined that the Constitution is structured around the concept of a parliamentary democracy; and that “[o]ne of the most fundamental aspects of parliamentary democracy is that, whilst a person is elected to represent the people of the district from which he is elected, he is not bound to act in accordance with the directives of the electorate either individually or as a body. He is elected because a majority of the voters regard him as the candidate best equipped to represent them and their interests in the government of their country. He is bound by the rules of parliament and answerable to parliament for the manner in which he acts. Should he lose the confidence of the electorate, he cannot be obliged to resign and he can only be removed for one of the reasons set out in sections 96 to 99 of the Constitution.” The Chief Justice also considered the question as to whether an MP's customary obligation to obey the commands of the island as expressed by the Falekaupule, overrides the MP's duties to Parliament.

The Falekaupule asserted that customary process known as falaesea (to banishment a person who defied the customary authority of the Falekaupule) provided the legal authority to order Metia to resign as a member of parliament. The Chief Justice stated that “[i]f the fifth principle of the Preamble is to have any real meaning, it must apply to this case. The Constitution is law for the whole of Tuvalu. It clearly and properly acknowledges the customary role of, and respect for, the falekaupule on each island but, when support for an island's custom and tradition will have a disproportionate effect on the whole country, the island's interests must be subordinated to the national interest. The constitutional preservation of those traditional values is a vital part of present day Tuvalu but I cannot accept that a decision to implement them on one island is reasonable if it will seriously have an adverse effect on the whole country. In the present case, I am satisfied that it was unreasonable for the Falekaupule to ignore the interests of the whole country over an affront to its dignity by one of the island community.”

The Chief Justice went on to state that “the carrying out of those threats by the orders banishing Metia and thus preventing him from properly performing the duties for which he was elected were clearly contrary to the spirit and intent of the Constitution and a totally unacceptable intrusion into the workings of the Tuvaluan Parliament. It should be borne in mind that the supremacy given Parliament by the Constitution is over the country as a whole and must, therefore, take precedence over purely local interests if the latter are in conflict with the national interest. I am satisfied that, as it was a challenge to parliamentary supremacy, it was unreasonable and was thus a breach of the defendant's right to procedural fairness. Similarly, the order of falaesea, although a part of the customary practices of Nukufetau, was so extremely disproportionate to the actions of the Falekaupule in similar previous cases as to be unfair.”

== The summoning of meetings of Parliament ==
The holding of elections of members of Parliament are described in sections 89 & 90.

The summoning of meetings of Parliament is covered by section 119(1) of the Constitution which states “Subject to this section, Parliament shall meet at such places in Tuvalu, and at such times, as the Head of State, acting in accordance with the advice of the Cabinet, appoints.”

The question as to whether the Governor-General has the power to summon Parliament without, or in disregard of the advice of Cabinet and, if so, the circumstances which could allow the use of that power was considered in Amasone v Attorney General. The Chief Justice stated that “In a country whose Constitution seeks to achieve a fair and democratic government, it must be contrary to the spirit of the Constitution for a Prime Minister who knows that he has actually lost his support in the House to try and stay in power by delaying the meeting of Parliament at which the loss of confidence would be confirmed. … Whether it is unfair or undemocratic will, of course, depend on the circumstances of the case. Thus, in the present case, the Prime Minister could not be said to have flouted the aspirations of section 4 by remaining in power prior to the by-elections in May even though at that time he had clearly lost his majority but, once those elections appeared to have changed the balance of power, it would accord with the principles of fair and democratic government to allow Parliament to decide as soon as possible.”

The Chief Justice then stated “The electorate is entitled to expect its wishes to be reflected in the composition of government as soon as practicable after it has voted. That must apply whenever the result of any election appears to have changed the balance of power in Parliament.” The Chief Justice concluded by setting out the sequence of events for the Governor-General to consider under what was then section 116(1), and is now section 119(1) of the 2023 Constitution, to assist his decision what is the appropriate action to take in relation to the time of the calling of the next meeting of Parliament.

The exercise of political judgment in the calling of by-elections and the summoning of parliament was again tested in 2013. Prime minister Willy Telavi delayed calling a by-election following the death of a member from Nukufetau until the opposition took legal action, which resulted in the High Court ordered the prime minister to issue a notice to hold the by-election. The 2013 Nukufetau by-election was won by the opposition candidate, which result meant that Telavi did not appear to have the support of a majority of the members of parliament.

A constitutional crisis developed in mid 2013 when prime minister Willy Telavi took the position that, under the Constitution, he was only required to convene parliament once a year, and was thus under no obligation to summon it until December 2013.

Tuvalu's opposition then requested the Governor-General Sir Iakoba Italeli to intervene against the prime minister's decision. On 3 July the Governor-General exercised his reserve powers in ordering Parliament to convene.

== Sources ==
- "Constitution of Tuvalu" (PDF). Government of Tuvalu. 1 October 2023. Archived from the original (PDF) on 15 February 2025.
- "Final Report – Constitutional Review Parliamentary Select Committee". Department of Foreign Affairs – Government of Tuvalu. 12 December 2022.
- "The Constitution Of Tuvalu Bill 2022". Department of Foreign Affairs – Government of Tuvalu. 12 December 2022.
- Jennifer Corrin-Care; Tess Newton; Don Paterson (1999), Introduction to South Pacific Law, London: Cavendish Publishing
