= List of current permanent representatives to the United Nations =

This is a list of the current permanent representatives to the United Nations at United Nations Headquarters, New York City. The list includes the country that they represent and the date that they presented their credentials to the UN Secretary-General. The list is sorted by the official order in which the flags are flown in front of UN buildings. This is also the seating arrangement in the General Assembly. Permanent representatives are also appointed to the United Nations Offices in Geneva, Vienna, and Nairobi; and permanent delegates to specialized agencies of the UN, such as FAO Headquarters in Rome, Italy and UNESCO Headquarters in Paris, France.

== United Nations member states ==
#	Country	Name	Date of presentation of credentials (as of 17 December 2025)	Former permanent representatives
1.	Afghanistan	Naseer Ahmad Faiq	Chargé d'affaires ad interim	Permanent Representative of Afghanistan to the United Nations
2.	Albania	Suela Janina	5 April 2024	Permanent Representative of Albania to the United Nations
3.	Algeria	Amar Bendjama	23 April 2023	Sabri Boukadoum (14 March 2014 - ?), Sofiane Mimouni (15 October 2019 – ?)
4.	Andorra	Joan Forner Rovira	9 September 2024	Andorran permanent representative to the United Nations in New York City
5.	Angola	Francisco José da Cruz	31 May 2023	Ismael Gaspar Martins
6.	Antigua and Barbuda	Walton Alfonso Webson	17 December 2014	
7.	Argentina	Francisco Fabián Tropepi	5 December 2024	Permanent Representative of Argentina to the United Nations
8.	Armenia	Paruyr Hovhannisyan	2 May 2025	Permanent Representative of Armenia to the United Nations
9.	Australia	James Larsen	26 July 2023	Permanent Representative of Australia to the United Nations
10.	Austria	Gregor Kössler	4 February 2025	Permanent Representative of Austria to the United Nations
11.	Azerbaijan	Tofig Musayev	4 February 2025	
12.	Bahamas	Stan Oduma Smith	10 March 2022	
13.	Bahrain	Jamal Fares Alrowaiei	14 September 2011	
14.	Bangladesh	Salahuddin Noman Chowdhury	20 September 2022	Permanent Representative of Bangladesh to the United Nations
15.	Barbados	François Ayodele Jackman	21 May 2021	Permanent Representative of Barbados to the United Nations
16.	Belarus	Valentin Rybakov	15 September 2017	Permanent Representative of Belarus to the United Nations
17.	Belgium	Sophie Jang de Smedt	13 January 2025	List of permanent representatives of Belgium to the United Nations
18.	Belize	Janine Elizabeth Coye-Felson	8 September 2025	Carlos Cecil Fuller
19.	Benin	Marc Hermanne G. Araba	5 January 2021	
20.	Bhutan	Pema Lektup Dorji	7 June 2024	
21.	Bolivia	Diego Pacheco Balanza	Chargé d'affaires ad interim	Diego Pary Rodríguez
22.	Bosnia and Herzegovina	Zlatko Lagumdžija	6 July 2023	Permanent Representative of Bosnia and Herzegovina to the United Nations
23.	Botswana	Charles Masole	5 June 2025	Gladys Mokhawa
24.	Brazil	Sérgio França Danese	6 July 2023	
25.	Brunei	Pengiran Hairani Pengiran Haji Tajuddin	21 May 2025	List of permanent representatives of Brunei to the United Nations
26.	Bulgaria	Gergana Karadjova	3 December 2025	Category:Permanent representatives of Bulgaria to the United Nations
27.	Burkina Faso	Oumarou Ganou	23 April 2023	
28.	Burundi	Zéphyrin Maniratanga	26 April 2021	Permanent Representative of Burundi to the United Nations in New York
29.	Cambodia	Chhea Keo	5 December 2024	Tithiarun Mao
30.	Cameroon	Michel Tommo Monthé	8 September 2008	
31.	Canada	David Lametti	17 November 2025	Permanent Representative of Canada to the United Nations
32.	Cape Verde	Tania Serafim Yvonne Romualdo	17 July 2023	José Luis Fialho Rocha (5 December 2016 – ?) Júlio César Freire de Morais (18 November 2021 – ?)
33.	Central African Republic	Marius Aristide Hoja Nzessioue	28 June 2024	
34.	Chad	Mouctar Abakar	2 August 2022	
35.	Chile	Paula Narváez Ojeda	8 June 2022	Milenko E. Skoknic Tapia (21 May 2018 – ?)
36.	China	Fu Cong	16 April 2024	Permanent Representative of China to the United Nations
37.	Colombia	Leonor Zalabata Torres	6 October 2022	Permanent Representative of Colombia to the United Nations
38.	Comoros	Issimail Chanfi	4 December 2020	
39.	Congo	Lazare Makayat-Safouesse	17 May 2022	
40.	Costa Rica	Maritza Chan	26 August 2022	Rodrigo Alberto Carazo (31 August 2018 –)
41.	Croatia	Hrvoje Ćurić Hrvatinić	Chargé d'affaires ad interim	Permanent Representative of Croatia to the United Nations
42.	Cuba	Ernesto Soberón Guzmán	5 April 2024	
43.	Cyprus	Maria Michail	7 December 2024	
44.	Czech Republic	Jakub Kulhánek	15 February 2022	Marie Chatardová (2 August 2016 – ?)
45.	Democratic Republic of the Congo	Zénon Mukongo Ngay	1 September 2023	Permanent Representative of the Democratic Republic of the Congo to the United Nations
46.	Denmark	Christina Markus Lassen	1 September 2023	
47.	Djibouti	Mohamed Siad Doualeh	24 November 2015	
48.	Dominica	Philbert Aaron	6 July 2023	
49.	Dominican Republic	Wellington Darío Bencosme Castaños	24 March 2025	José Alfonso Blanco Conde
50.	Ecuador	Andrés Efren Montalvo Sosa	5 December 2024	José Javier De la Gasca Lopez Domínguez
51.	Egypt	Ihab Moustafa Awad Moustafa	17 December 2025	Osama Mahmoud Abdel Khalek Mahmoud
52.	El Salvador	Egriselda López	21 August 2019	
53.	Equatorial Guinea	Anatolio Ndong Mba	7 January 2010	
54.	Eritrea	Sophia Tesfamariam	5 September 2019	
55.	Estonia	Rein Tammsaar	30 August 2022	
56.	Eswatini	Thamie Dlamini	5 July 2022	
57.	Ethiopia	Tesfaye Yilma Sabo	13 February 2023	
58.	Fiji	Filipo Tarakinikini	17 April 2023	
59.	Finland	Outi Elina Kalkku	30 August 2022	Jukka Salovaara (4 June 2019 – ?)
60.	France	Jérôme Bonnafont	1 March 2025	Permanent Representative of France to the United Nations
61.	Gabon	Ghislain Ondias Okouma	9 September 2024	
62.	Gambia	Lamin B. Dibba	16 September 2022	
63.	Georgia	David Bakradze	16 September 2022	
64.	Germany	Ricklef Johannes Beutin	25 August 2025	Permanent Representative of Germany to the United Nations
65.	Ghana	Harold Adlai Agyeman	21 May 2021	
66.	Greece	Aglaia Balta	25 August 2025	Permanent Representative of Greece to the United Nations
67.	Grenada	Ingrid Jackson	11 July 2025	Grenadian Permanent Representative to the United Nations
68.	Guatemala	José Alberto Bríz Gutiérrez	6 November 2024	Carla María Rodríguez Mancia
69.	Guinea	Mohamed Dabo	28 March 2025	
70.	Guinea-Bissau	Samba Sane	16 September 2022	
71.	Guyana	Carolyn Allison Rodrigues-Birkett	2 October 2020	Permanent Representative of Guyana to the United Nations
72.	Haiti	Pierre Ericq Pierre	7 March 2025	
73.	Honduras	Mary Elizabeth Flores	29 April 2010	Permanent Representative of Honduras to the United Nations
74.	Hungary	Zsuzsanna Horváth	16 February 2021	Permanent Representative of Hungary to the United Nations (New York)
75.	Iceland	Anna Jóhannesdóttir	9 September 2024	
76.	India	Parvathaneni Harish	9 September 2024	Permanent Representative of India to the United Nations
77.	Indonesia	Umar Hadi	19 September 2025	Permanent Representative of Indonesia to the United Nations
78.	Iran	Amir-Saeid Iravani	7 September 2022	Permanent Representative of Iran to the United Nations
79.	Iraq	Lukman Abdulraheem Al-Faily	24 July 2025	Permanent Representative of Iraq to the United Nations
80.	Ireland	Fergal Tomas Mythen	26 August 2022	
81.	Israel	Danny Danon	19 August 2024	Permanent Representative of Israel to the United Nations
82.	Italy	Maurizio Massari	19 July 2021	Permanent Representative of Italy to the United Nations
83.	Ivory Coast	Moriko Tiémoko	12 July 2018	
84.	Jamaica	Brian Christopher Manley Wallace	16 September 2021	Permanent Representative of Jamaica to the United Nations
85.	Japan	Kazuyuki Yamazaki	19 December 2023	
86.	Jordan	Walid Obeidat	25 August 2025	Permanent Representative of Jordan to the United Nations
87.	Kazakhstan	Kairat Umarov	19 June 2024	Permanent Representative of Kazakhstan to the United Nations
88.	Kenya	Erastus Ekitela Lokaale	12 August 2024	
89.	Kiribati	Teburoro Tito	13 September 2017	
90.	Kuwait	Tareq Albanai	2 August 2022	
91.	Kyrgyzstan	Aida Kasymalieva	15 February 2022	Mirgul Moldoisaeva (12 April 2016 – ?)
92.	Laos	Thongphane Savanphet	11 July 2025	Anouparb Vongnorkeo
93.	Latvia	Sanita Pavļuta-Deslandes	22 August 2023	
94.	Lebanon	Ahmad Arafa	25 August 2025	Hadi Hachem
95.	Lesotho	Matete Nena	6 July 2023	
96.	Liberia	Lewis Garseedah Brown II	28 March 2025	Permanent Representative of Liberia to the United Nations
97.	Libya	Taher M. El-Sonni	6 January 2020	
98.	Liechtenstein	Christian Wenaweser	1 October 2002	
99.	Lithuania	Rytis Paulauskas	25 May 2021	Permanent Representative of Lithuania to the United Nations
100.	Luxembourg	Olivier Maes	15 July 2021	Permanent Representative of Luxembourg to the United Nations
101.	Madagascar	As of December 2025, no representative (2025 Malagasy coup d'état)		
102.	Malawi	Agnes Mary Chimbiri-Molande	13 January 2022	
103.	Malaysia	Ahmad Faisal Muhamad	29 March 2023	
104.	Maldives	Ali Naseer Mohamed	22 May 2024	Permanent Representative of the Maldives to the United Nations
105.	Mali	Issa Konfourou	9 September 2016	
106.	Malta	Natasha Meli Daudey	8 September 2025	Category:Permanent representatives of Malta to the United Nations
107.	Marshall Islands	John Silk	19 June 2024	
108.	Mauritania	Sidi Mohamed Laghdaf	20 August 2020	
109.	Mauritius	Milan Jaya Nyamrajsingh Meetarbhan	25 February 2025	Category:Permanent representatives of Mauritius to the United Nations
110.	Mexico	Héctor Vasconcelos	30 January 2024	Permanent Mission of Mexico to the United Nations
111.	Federated States of Micronesia	Jeem Lippwe	24 October 2022	
112.	Moldova	Gheorghe Leucă	18 November 2021	Permanent Representative of Moldova to the United Nations
113.	Monaco	Isabelle F. Picco	11 September 2009	
114.	Mongolia	Ankhbayar Nyamdorj	9 July 2024	
115.	Montenegro	Dragana Radulović	22 April 2025	Damir Sabanovic
116.	Morocco	Omar Hilale	23 April 2014	Permanent Representative of Morocco to the United Nations
117.	Mozambique	Domingos Estêvão Fernandes	24 March 2025	Pedro Comissário Afonso
118.	Myanmar	Kyaw Moe Tun	20 October 2020	Category:Permanent representatives of Myanmar to the United Nations
119.	Namibia	Pendapala Andreas Naanda	8 September 2025	Neville Melvin Gertze
120.	Nauru	Lara Erab Daniel	9 September 2024	
121.	Nepal	Lok Bahadur Thapa	1 September 2023	
122.	Netherlands	Lise Gregoire-van Haaren	1 October 2024	
123.	New Zealand	Carolyn Schwalger	4 January 2022	List of permanent representatives of New Zealand to the United Nations
124.	Nicaragua	Jaime Hermida Castillo	18 October 2018	
125.	Niger	Samadou Ousman	Chargé d'affaires ad interim	
126.	Nigeria	Syndoph Paebi Endoni	Chargé d'affaires ad interim	Nigeria and the United Nations#List of permanent representatives
127.	North Korea	Kim Song	20 September 2018	Permanent Mission of North Korea to the United Nations
128.	North Macedonia	Kristina Kozovska Gavrilova	Chargé d'affaires ad interim	Category:Permanent representatives of North Macedonia to the United Nations
129.	Norway	Merete Fjeld Brattested	1 September 2023	
130.	Oman	Omar Said Al Kathiri	5 December 2024	Mohamed Al Hassan
131.	Pakistan	Asim Iftikhar Ahmad	2 April 2025	Permanent Representative of Pakistan to the United Nations
132.	Palau	Ilana Victorya Seid	16 September 2021	
133.	Panama	Eloy Alfaro de Alba	9 September 2024	Permanent Representative of Panama to the United Nations
134.	Papua New Guinea	Fred Sarufa	9 July 2024	
135.	Paraguay	Marcelo Eliseo Scappini Ricciardi	9 July 2024	
136.	Peru	Gustavo Lino Adrianzén Olaya	11 July 2025	Enrique Armando Román Morey
137.	Philippines	Enrique Manalo	9 September 2025	Permanent Representative of the Philippines to the United Nations
138.	Poland	Krzysztof Szczerski	2 September 2021	List of ambassadors of Poland to the United Nations
139.	Portugal	Rui Manuel Vinhas Tavares Gabriel	19 June 2024	
140.	Qatar	Sheikha Alya Ahmed Saif Al-Thani	24 October 2013	
141.	Romania	Cornel Feruță	16 September 2022	Permanent Representative of Romania to the United Nations
142.	Russia	Vassily A. Nebenzia	28 July 2017	Permanent Representative of Russia to the United Nations
143.	Rwanda	Martin K. Ngoga	22 May 2025	Ernest Rwamucyo
144.	Saint Kitts and Nevis	Mutryce Williams	15 January 2024	
145.	Saint Lucia	Menissa Rambally	10 March 2022	Category:Permanent representatives of Saint Lucia to the United Nations
146.	Saint Vincent and the Grenadines	Inga Rhonda King	13 September 2013	
147.	Samoa	Fatumanava-o-Upolu III Pa'olelei Luteru	2 June 2021	
148.	San Marino	Damiano Beleffi	22 August 2016	
149.	São Tomé and Príncipe	Djazalde Pires dos Santos Aguiar	Chargé d'affaires ad interim	Alcínio Cravid e Silva
150.	Saudi Arabia	Abdulaziz Alwasil	2 August 2022	
151.	Senegal	Coly Seck	13 January 2025	Cheikh Niang
152.	Serbia	Radomir Ilić	Chargé d'affaires ad interim	Nemanja Stevanović
153.	Seychelles	Vivianne Simone Fock Tav	3 December 2025	
154.	Sierra Leone	Michael Imran Kanu	1 September 2023	
155.	Singapore	Burhan Gafoor	22 August 2016	
156.	Slovakia	Peter Hulényi	9 September 2024	
157.	Slovenia	Samuel Žbogar	7 March 2025	
158.	Solomon Islands	Jane Mugafalu Kabui Waetara	16 June 2022	Robert Sisilo (23 January 2017 – ?)
159.	Somalia	Abukar Dahir Osman	26 July 2017	
160.	South Africa	Mathu Theda Joyini	22 January 2021	Permanent Representative of South Africa to the United Nations
161.	South Korea	Jihoon Cha	19 September 2025	Hwang Joon-kook
162.	South Sudan	Cecilia Adout Majok Adeng	12 February 2024	Permanent Representative of South Sudan to the United Nations
163.	Spain	Héctor José Gómez Hernández	19 December 2023	Permanent Representative of Spain to the United Nations
164.	Sri Lanka	Jayantha Chandrasiri Jayasuriya	5 June 2025	Permanent Representative of Sri Lanka to the United Nations
165.	Sudan	Al-Harith Idriss Al-Harith Mohamed	23 May 2023	Permanent Representative of Sudan the United Nations
166.	Suriname	Sunil Algram Sitaldin	4 January 2022	
167.	Sweden	Nicola Jane Forbes Clase	7 October 2024	Permanent Representative of Sweden to the United Nations
168.	Switzerland	Pascale Baeriswyl	26 June 2020	
169.	Syria	Ibrahim Olabi	19 August 2025	Permanent Representative of Syria to the United Nations
170.	Tajikistan	Jonibek Ismoil Hikmat	4 June 2021	
171.	Tanzania	Suleiman Haji Suleiman	Chargé d'affaires ad interim	Permanent Representative of Tanzania to the United Nations
172.	Thailand	Cherdchai Chaivaivid	7 June 2024	
173.	Timor-Leste	Dionísio da Costa Babo Soares	27 February 2024	
174.	Togo	Koffi Akakpo	Chargé d'affaires ad interim	Kokou Kpayedo (30 June 2016 - ?)
175.	Tonga	Viliami Va'inga Tōnē	5 July 2018	
176.	Trinidad and Tobago	Neil Nadesh Parsan	25 August 2025	Ordell Cedric Barman
177.	Tunisia	Nabil Ammar	25 March 2025	Category:Permanent representatives of Tunisia to the United Nations
178.	Turkey	Ahmet Yıldız	25 April 2024	Permanent Representative of Turkey to the United Nations
179.	Turkmenistan	Aksoltan Ataýewa	23 February 1995	
180.	Tuvalu	Tapugao Falefou	13 February 2023	Permanent Representative of Tuvalu to the United Nations
181.	Uganda	Adonia Ayebare	3 May 2017	
182.	Ukraine	Andrii Melnyk	29 May 2025	Permanent Representative of Ukraine to the United Nations
183.	United Arab Emirates	Mohamed Issa Abushahab	15 April 2024	
184.	United Kingdom	Sarah MacIntosh	29 July 2026	Permanent Representative of the United Kingdom to the United Nations
185.	United States	Mike Waltz	21 September 2025	United States Ambassador to the United Nations
186.	Uruguay	Laura Dupuy Lasserre	1 August 2025	Permanent Representative of Uruguay to the United Nations
187.	Uzbekistan	Ulugbek Lapasov	22 August 2023	Bakhtiyor Ibragimov
188.	Vanuatu	Odo Tevi	13 August 2014	
189.	Venezuela	Samuel R. Moncada Acosta	19 December 2017	
190.	Vietnam	Do Hung Viet	20 June 2025	Đặng Đình Quý (12 July 2018 – ?) Đặng Hoàng Giang
191.	Yemen	Abdullah Ali Fadhel Al-Saadi	20 December 2018	
192.	Zambia	Chola Milambo	17 May 2022	Permanent Representative of Zambia to the United Nations
193.	Zimbabwe	Taonga Mushayavanhu	7 June 2024	Albert Ranganai Chimbindi

== United Nations General Assembly observers ==
=== Non-member observer states ===
(as of 17 December 2025)

State	Name	Date of presentation of credentials	Former Permanent Observers
Holy See	Gabriele Giordano Caccia	28 January 2020	Permanent Observer of the Holy See to the United Nations
Palestine	Riyad H. Mansour	12 September 2005	Palestinian Ambassador to the United Nations

=== Intergovernmental organizations ===
Entity	Name	Date of presentation of credentials
African Union	Fatima Kyari Mohammed	23 March 2018
Asian–African Legal Consultative Organization	Roy S. Lee	9 November 2009
Caribbean Community	Missouri Sherman-Peter	5 November 2014
Central American Integration System	Carlos Campos	16 October 2015
Commonwealth of Nations	Patricia Scotland	1 April 2016
Cooperation Council for the Arab States of the Gulf	Mohammed Alnowaiser	15 September 2017
Economic Community of Central African States	Jeanne d'Arc Byaje	18 February 2019
Economic Community of Western African States	Tanou Koné	17 February 2015
European Public Law Organization	Barbara Faedda	21 May 2019
European Union	Stavros Lambrinidis	15 January 2024
Intergovernmental Authority on Development	Cherinet Hariffo	7 March, 2025
International Anti-Corruption Academy	Larry D. Johnson	2 September 2021
International Chamber of Commerce	Andrew Wilson	28 February 2018
International Criminal Police Organization	Odd Reidar Humlegård	17 August 2021
International Development Law Organization	Patrizio M. Civili	16 October 2015
International Institute for Democracy and Electoral Assistance	Massimo Tommasoli	16 October 2015
International Organization for Migration	Ashraf Elnour Mustafa Mohamed Nour	11 May 2015
International Organisation of La Francophonie	Ifigeneia Kontoleontos	18 August 2017
International Renewable Energy Agency	Alain Wilfired Biya	11 June 2019
International Seabed Authority	Michael W. Lodge	28 February 2018
International Union for Conservation of Nature	David Chadwick O'Connor	24 November 2015
International Youth Organization for Ibero-America	Daniel del Valle Blanco	2000s
Latin American, Caribbean Indigenous Peoples Fund	Oscar Horacio Aguilar Colindres	21 May 2019
League of Arab States	Maged Abdelfattah Abdelaziz	15 September 2017
Organisation for Economic Co-operation and Development	Robin Ogilvy	5 July 2018
Organization of American States	Gonzalo Koncke	25 January 2016
Organisation of Islamic Cooperation	Agshin Mehdiyev	30 June 2016
Parliamentary Assembly of the Mediterranean	Qazi Shaukat Fareed	31 July 2015
Partners in Population and Development	Mohammad Nurul Alam	6 July 2012
South Centre	Manuel F. Montes	5 July 2017
University for Peace	Narinder Kakar	16 March 2009

=== Other entities ===
Listed below are representatives from organizations, not sovereign states, described by the United Nations as "Other entities having received a standing invitation to participate as observers in the sessions and the work of the General Assembly and maintaining permanent offices at Headquarters." (as of 28 July 2019)

Entity	Name	Date of presentation of credentials
International Committee of the Red Cross	Robert Mardini	5 September 2018
International Federation of Red Cross and Red Crescent Societies	Richard Blewitt	13 August 2018
International Olympic Committee	Mario Pescante	15 March 2010
Inter-Parliamentary Union	Paddy Torsney	16 April 2014
Sovereign Military Order of Malta	Paul Beresford-Hill	1 August 2019

== See also ==
- Outline of the United Nations
- List of United Nations organizations by location
- List of current foreign ministers
- List of female foreign ministers
