= Stan Smith (disambiguation) =

Stan Smith (born 1946) is an American tennis player.

Stan or Stanley Smith may also refer to:

== Sportspeople ==
- Stan Smith (footballer, born 1884) (1884–1956), English footballer who played for Southampton
- Stan Smith (footballer, born 1931) (1931–2010), English footballer who played for Port Vale, Crewe Alexandra and Oldham Athletic
- Stan Smith (Australian footballer, born 1925) (1925–2019), Australian footballer for Collingwood
- Stan Smith (Australian footballer, born 1932) (1932–2012), Australian footballer for South Melbourne
- Stanley Smith (rugby league, born c. 1910) (1910–1978), rugby league footballer of the 1920s and 1930s for Great Britain, England, Wakefield Trinity, and Leeds
- Stanley Smith (rugby league, born 1937) (1937–2012), rugby league footballer of the 1950s and 1960s for Wakefield Trinity and Bramley
- Stanley Smith (racing driver) (1949–2020), NASCAR driver and dirt-track racer
- Stanley Smith (cricketer) (1910–1984), Australian cricketer
- Stanley Smith (cyclist) (born 1952), Barbadian cyclist
- Stan Smith (athlete) (1904–1986), English athlete

== Other ==
- Stan Smith (American Dad!), fictional main character of the animated television series American Dad!
- Stan Smith (economist) (born 1946), American economist
- Stan Smith (criminal) (1937–2010), Australian criminal
- Adidas Stan Smith, tennis shoe made by Adidas and named for the tennis player
- Stanley E. Smith Jr. (1919–1973), American politician
- Stanley P. Smith (1861–1931), British Protestant Christian missionary to China
- Stanley Smith (geologist) (1883–1955), British geologist and academic
- Stanley Wyatt Smith (1887–1958), consul-general of Manila, and of Honolulu
- Stanley Smith (actor) (1903–1974), American film actor and singer
- Stanley Wyatt Smith (3 April 1887–1958), British diplomat
- Stan Oduma Smith, Bahamian diplomat and lawyer
- Stanley Smith (surveyor), attempted to investigate a potential route from the head of the Lillooet River to the coast, see Canadian Pacific Survey

== See also ==
- Stanley Alexander de Smith (1922–1974), English academic lawyer and author
