= Julius Pranevičius =

Lithuanian diplomat (born 1977)

Permanent Representative of Lithuania to the United Nations
- Incumbent
- Assumed office 10 April 2026
- President: Gitanas Nausėda
- Preceded by: Rytis Paulauskas

Vice-Minister of Foreign Affairs
- In office 12 December 2024 – 3 October 2025
- Minister: Kęstutis Budrys
- Succeeded by: Laura Šerėnienė

Personal details
- Born: 18 March 1977 (age 49) Ukmergė, Lithuania SSR, Soviet Union
- Education: Vilnius University

Julius Pranevičius (Lithuanian: [ˈjuːlʲʊs prɐnʲɛˈvʲiːt͡ɕʊs]; born 18 March 1977) is a Lithuanian diplomat and civil servant who is expected to become the Ambassador and Permanent Representative of Lithuania to the United Nations on 10 April 2026. He served as the Vice-Minister of Foreign Affairs from 12 December 2024 until 3 October 2025.

== Early life and education ==
Pranevičius was born on 18 March 1977 in Ukmergė, Lithuania. He studied at Vilnius University, where he obtained a bachelor's degree in political science. He later completed a master's degree in European studies at the Institute of International Relations and Political Science of Vilnius University.

== Diplomatic career ==
Pranevičius has worked in the Lithuanian diplomatic service since the early 2000s. During more than two decades in diplomacy, he has held various positions in the Ministry of Foreign Affairs of Lithuania, primarily working on European Union policy, multilateral relations, and Lithuania's participation in EU institutions.

From 2003 to 2006 he served as Second Secretary at the Permanent Representation of Lithuania to the European Union in Brussels, where he worked on issues related to EU institutions and the representation of Lithuanian interests in EU decision-making processes.

From 2015 to 2018 he served as Consul General of Lithuania in New York.

From 2018 to 2022 he served as Ambassador Extraordinary and Plenipotentiary of Lithuania to India and was also accredited to Nepal.

After returning to the Ministry of Foreign Affairs, he headed the Indo-Pacific policy division in 2023–2024.

From 2024 to 2025 he served as Vice-Minister of Foreign Affairs of Lithuania.

On 10 April 2026 he began serving as Ambassador and Permanent Representative of Lithuania to the United Nations.
