= General debate of the sixty-fifth session of the United Nations General Assembly =

United Nations General Debate Assembly

- 23 – 29 September 2010 65th session 65th general debate

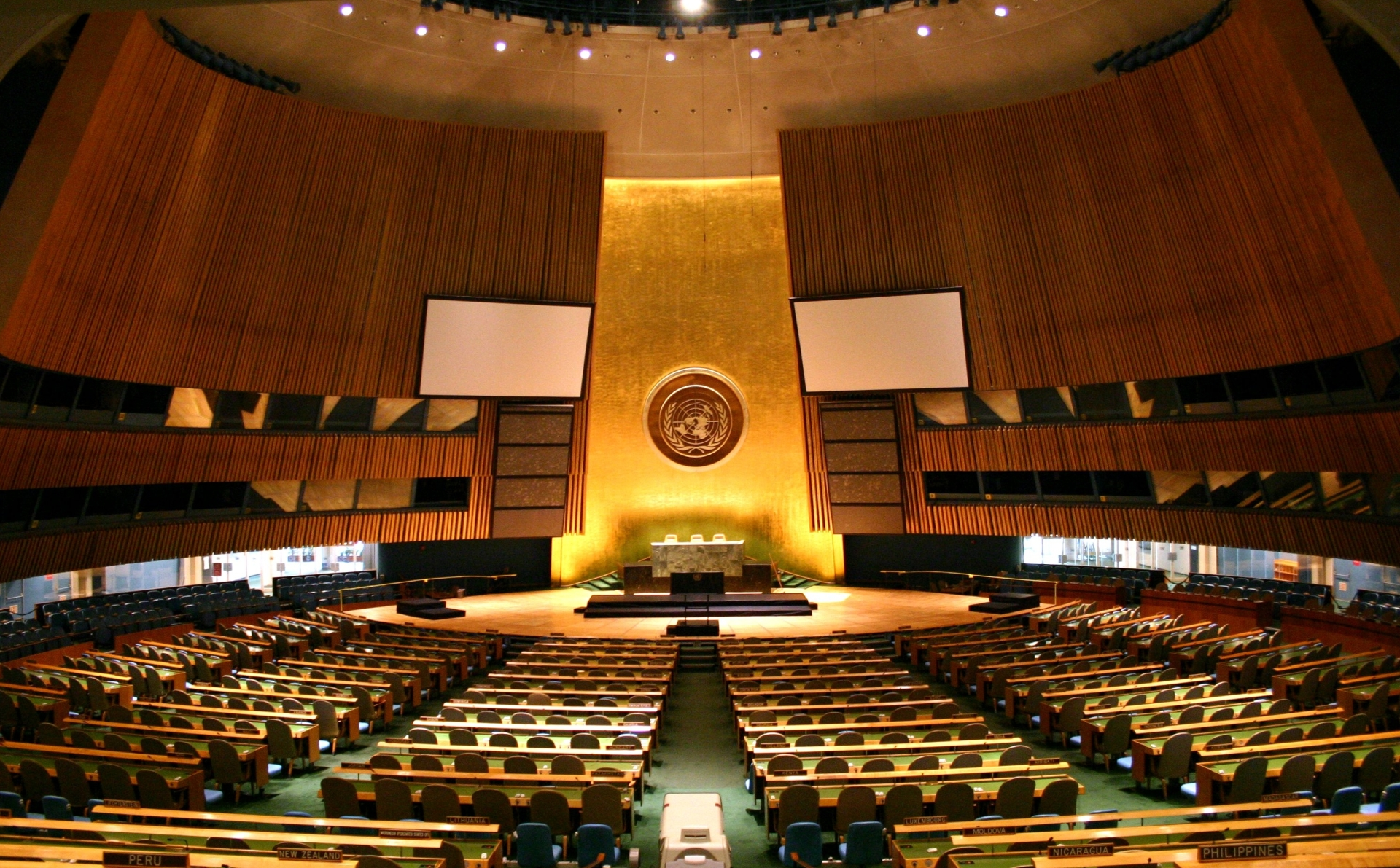
- General Assembly Hall at United Nations Headquarters, New York City
- Host country: United Nations
- Cities: New York City, United States
- Venues: General Assembly Hall at the United Nations Headquarters
- Participants: United Nations Member States
- President: Joseph Deiss
- Secretary-General: Ban Ki-moon
- Website: gadebate.un.org/en/sessions-archive/65

The general debate of the sixty-fifth session of the United Nations General Assembly was the first debate of the 65th session of the General Assembly that ran from 23 – 29 September 2010. Leaders from member states addressed the General Assembly.

== Organization ==
The speaking order of the general debate is different from the speaking order of other General Assembly debates. For the general debate, Secretary-General speaks first delivering their "Report of the Secretary-General on the work of the Organization, " they are then followed by: the President of the General Assembly who opens the general debate, the delegate from Brazil and the Delegate from the United States of America. After this, the order is first given to Member States, then Observer States and supranational bodies. For all other Member States, the speaking order is based on their level of representation at the general debate, order preference and other criteria such as geographic balance.

According to the rules in place for the general debate, statements should be made in one of the United Nations' official languages of Arabic, Chinese, English, French, Russian or Spanish, and are translated by United Nations translators. Additionally, speakers are usually limited to a 15-minute time limit in order to comply with the schedule set up by the General Committee. Member States are also advised to provide 350 paper copies of their statements in order for them to be distributed to other Member States, as well as to translation services.

The theme for the 64th session was chosen by President Joseph Deiss as: "Reaffirming the central role of the United Nations in global governance." After their election, the newly elected President of the General Assembly advises all Member States of the debate of the upcoming Session, and invites them to focus their speeches on the proposed theme.

== Speaking schedule ==
=== 23 September 2010 ===
Morning Session

- United Nations – Secretary-General Ban Ki-moon (Report of the Secretary-General on the work of the Organization)
- United Nations – President of the 65th Session of the General Assembly Joseph Deiss (Opening)
- Brazil – Minister for Foreign Affairs Celso Luiz Nunes Amorim
- Switzerland – President Doris Leuthart
- United States of America – President Barack Obama
- Malawi – President Bingu Wa Mutharika
- Costa Rica – President Laura Chinchilla Miranda
- Sri Lanka – President Mahinda Rajapaksa
- Turkey – President Abdullah Gül
- Qatar – Amir Hamad bin Khalifa Al-Thani
- Kenya – President Mwai Kibaki
- Tajikistan – President Emomali Rahmon
- Peru – President Alan García Pérez
- Ukraine – President Viktor Yanukovych
- China – Premier Wen Jiabao
- Canada – Prime Minister Stephen Harper

Afternoon Session

- Georgia – President Mikheil Saakashvili
- Iran (Islamic Republic of) – President Mahmoud Ahmadinejad
- Slovakia – President Ivan Gašparovič
- Jordan – King Abdullah II
- Democratic Republic of the Congo – President Joseph Kabila Kabange
- Azerbaijan – President Ilham Heydar oglu Aliyev
- Panama – President Ricardo Martinelli Berrocal
- Cameroon – President Paul Biya
- Chile – President Sebastián Piñera
- Albania – President Bamir Topi
- Dominican Republic – President Leonel Fernández Reyna
- Lithuania – President Dalia Grybauskaitė
- Bolivia (Plurinational State of) – President Evo Morales Ayma
- Sierra Leone – President Ernest Bai Koroma
- Iraq – President Jalal Talabani
- Niger – President Salou Djibo
- Belgium – Deputy Prime Minister Steven Vanackere
- Benin – Minister for Foreign Affairs Jean-Marie Ehouzou

Right of Reply
Islamic Republic of Iran
The Islamic Republic of Iran used its Right of Reply to respond to statements made by Belgium in its general debate speech before the Assembly. Belgium, in its speech, stated that non-acceptance for the provisions of the Non-Proliferation of Nuclear Weapons Treaty (NPT) by countries like North Korea and Iran threatened the international nonproliferation regime.

Iran responded by stating that Iran's had always been for peaceful purposes, which had been confirmed numerous times by the International Atomic Energy Agency. It continued by stating it was the right of every sovereign nation to develop peaceful nuclear energy under the NPT, and that Iran was not an exception in this regard. Finally, it stated that the international community should focus more on the secret, non-safeguarded nuclear-weapon installations of the Zionist regime, and not those of the peaceful, safeguarded nuclear facilities of the Islamic Republic of Iran.

Belgium
Belgium used its Right of Reply to respond to the Right of Reply of the Islamic Republic of Iran. Belgium stated that, as a member of the European Union, it fully adhered to the position repeatedly expressed by the European Union with regard to the Iranian nuclear issue.

=== 24 September 2010 ===
Morning Session

- Hungary – President Pál Schmitt
- Argentina – President Cristina Fernández de Kirchner
- Gabon – President Ali Bongo Ondimba
- Lebanon – President Michel Sleiman
- Senegal – President Abdoulaye Wade
- Finland – President Tarja Halonen
- Palau – President Johnson Toribiong
- Cyprus – President Demetris Christofias
- Nigeria – President Goodluck Ebele Jonathan
- United Kingdom of Great Britain and Northern Ireland – Deputy Prime Minister Nick Clegg
- Kuwait – Prime Minister Nasser Al-Mohammad Al-Ahmad Al-Sabah
- Japan – Prime Minister Naoto Kan
- Luxembourg – Deputy Prime Minister Jean Asselborn

Afternoon Session

- Liberia – President Ellen Johnson-Sirleaf
- Colombia – President Juan Manuel Santos Calderón
- Zimbabwe – President Robert Mugabe
- Haiti – President René Garcia Préval
- Rwanda – President Paul Kagame
- Namibia – President Hifikepunye Pohamba
- Guyana – President Bharrat Jagdeo
- Comoros – President Ahmed Abdallah Sambi
- El Salvador – President Carlos Mauricio Funes Cartagena
- Estonia – President Toomas Hendrik Ilves
- Philippines – President Benigno Aquino III
- Montenegro – President Filip Vujanović
- Uganda – President Yoweri Kaguta Museveni
- Lao People's Democratic Republic – President Choummaly Sayasone
- Nauru – President Marcus Stephen
- Latvia – President Valdis Zatlers
- North Macedonia – President Gjorge Ivanov
- Togo – Prime Minister Gilbert Fossoun Houngbo
- Romania – Prime Minister Emil Boc
- Saint Lucia – Prime Minister Stephenson King
- New Zealand – Minister for Foreign Affairs Murray McCully
- Iceland – Minister for Foreign Affairs Össur Skarphéðinsson
- Congo – Minister for Foreign Affairs Basile Ikouébé
- Honduras – Secretary of State Mario Canahuati

Right of Reply
Islamic Republic of Iran
The delegation of Islamic Republic of Iran used its Right of Reply to respond to statements made by both Kuwait and the United Kingdom in their general debate speeches before the Assembly. Kuwait, in its speech, stated that the disputed islands of Abu Musa and the Greater and Lesser Tunbs were illegally occupied Emarati Islands, and called for a resolution according to the principles and bases of international law. Iran responded by stating that there was no conflict whatsoever over the islands, as they were an eternal part of the Iranian territory and were under the sovereignty of the Islamic Republic of Iran.

Iran also responded to statements made by the United Kingdom made in its speech before the Assembly. The United Kingdom, in its speech, raised its concern over the Iranian nuclear program, and denounced comments made by Iranian President Ahmedinejad in his general debate address as an attempt to distract attention from Iran's nuclear obligations and to generate media headlines. In his speech, Ahmedinejad had implied that a majority of Americans, as well as people from around the world, agreed that the United States Government orchestrated the [ September 11th ] attacks to reverse the declining American economy and its grip on the Middle East.

Iran responded to the United Kingdom by defending Ahmedinejad, stating that he simply raised a number of questions concerning one of the main events of the past decade. Additionally, it reminded the body that Iran was among the first nations to denounce the terrorist attacks as cowardly and atrocious.

=== 25 September 2010 ===
Morning Session

- Marshall Islands – President Jurelang Zedkaia
- Dominica – President Nicholas Joseph Orville Liverpool
- Eswatini – Head of State Mswati III
- Serbia – President Boris Tadić
- Suriname – President Desiré Delano Bouterse
- Guinea-Bissau – President Malam Bacai Sanhá
- Somalia – President Sharif Sheikh Ahmed
- Bosnia and Herzegovina – President Haris Silajdžić
- Slovenia – Prime Minister Borut Pahor
- Portugal – Prime Minister José Socrates
- Netherlands – Prime Minister Jan Peter Balkenende
- Palestine (State of) – President Mahmoud Abbas
- Mauritania – Prime Minister Moulaye Ould Mohamed Laghdaf
- Germany – Vice-Chancellor Guido Westerwelle
- Egypt – Minister for Foreign Affairs Ahmed Aboul Gheit
- Australia – Minister for Foreign Affairs Kevin Rudd
- Kazakhstan – Secretary of State Kanat Saudabayev

Afternoon Session

- Timor-Leste – President José Ramos-Horta
- Czech Republic – President Václav Klaus
- Kiribati – President Anote Tong
- Burundi – Vice-president Gervais Rufyikiri
- Micronesia (Federated States of) – Vice-president Alik L. Alik
- Bangladesh – Prime Minister Sheikh Hasina
- Italy – Minister for Foreign Affairs Franco Frattini
- Spain – Minister for Foreign Affairs Miguel Ángel Moratinos Cuyaubé
- Austria – Federal Minister for Europe, Integration and Foreign Affairs Michael Spindelegger
- South Africa – Minister for Foreign Affairs Maite Nkoana-Mashabane
- Armenia – Minister for Foreign Affairs Edward Nalbandian
- Republic of Korea – Minister for Foreign Affairs and Foreign Trade Shin Kak-Soo

Right of Reply
Sudan
Sudan used its Right of Reply to respond to statements made by the Netherlands in its general debate speech before the Assembly. The Netherlands, in its speech, praised advances in international criminal law, while also denouncing the fact that individuals with International Criminal Court (ICC) warrants, such as President Omar al-Bashir of Sudan, were allowed to move freely in ICC partner states.

Sudan responded by stating that the Vienna Convention on the Law of Treaties stipulates that a State that is not a party to a treaty is not bound by that treaty's provisions. In this case, Sudan was not a signatory of the Rome Statute of the International Criminal Court and, as such, was not bound by its provisions. It also praised Resolution Assembly/AU/13(XIII) of the African Union (AU) which gave AU Member States the legal grounds to not cooperate with the ICC in regards to the arrest and surrender of individuals, and further reserved the right of the AU to make any decisions that may be deemed necessary in order to preserve and safeguard the dignity, sovereignty and integrity of the continent. Finally, it called the statements by the Netherlands unacceptable and accused it of interfering in the internal affairs of Sudan.

=== 27 September 2010 ===
Morning Session

- Ecuador – Vice-president Lenín Moreno Garcés
- Botswana – Vice-president Mompati Merafhe
- Maldives – Vice-president Mohamed Waheed Hassan
- United Republic of Tanzania – Prime Minister Mizengo Pinda
- Sudan – Vice-president Ali Osman Mohamed Taha
- Jamaica – Prime Minister Orette Bruce Golding
- Malaysia – Prime Minister Mohammad Najib bin Tun Haji Abdul Razak
- Fiji – Prime Minister Josaia Bainimarama
- Lesotho – Prime Minister Pakalitha Bethuel Mosisili
- Samoa – Prime Minister Tuilaepa Sailele Malielegaoi
- San Marino – Minister for Foreign Affairs Antonella Mularoni
- Morocco – Prime Minister Abbas El Fassi
- Saint Kitts and Nevis – Deputy Prime Minister Sam Condor
- France – Minister for Foreign Affairs Bernard Kouchner
- Algeria – Minister for Foreign Affairs Mourad Medelci
- Kyrgyzstan – Minister for Foreign Affairs Ruslan Kazakbaev
- Bahrain – Minister for Foreign Affairs Khalid bin Ahmed Al Khalifa
- Cuba – Minister for Foreign Affairs Bruno Rodríguez Parrilla
- Seychelles – Minister for Foreign Affairs Jean-Paul Adam

Afternoon Session

- Papua New Guinea – Prime Minister Michael Somare
- Mongolia – Prime Minister Batbold Sukhbaatar
- Antigua and Barbuda – Prime Minister Winston Baldwin Spencer
- Andorra – Head of Government Jaume Bartumeu Cassany
- Vanuatu – Prime Minister Edward Natapei
- Grenada – Prime Minister Tillman Thomas
- Trinidad and Tobago – Prime Minister Kamla Persad-Bissessar
- Croatia – Prime Minister Jadranka Kosor
- Afghanistan – Minister for Foreign Affairs Zalmai Rassoul
- Nicaragua – Minister for Foreign Affairs Samuel Santos López
- Solomon Islands – Minister for Foreign Affairs and Foreign Trade Peter Shanel Agovaka
- Ireland – Minister for Foreign Affairs Micheál Martin
- Gambia (Republic of The) – Minister for Foreign Affairs Mamadou Tangara
- Sao Tome and Principe – Minister for Foreign Affairs Manuel Salvador dos Ramos
- Central African Republic – Minister for Foreign Affairs Antoine Gambi
- Brunei Darussalam – Minister for Foreign Affairs and Foreign Trade Mohamed Bolkiah
- Mozambique – Minister for Foreign Affairs Oldemiro Marques Balói
- Nepal – Minister of State Bhim Bahadur Rawal
- Zambia – Minister of State Kalombo Mwansa

=== 28 September 2010 ===
Morning Session

- Malta – Deputy Prime Minister Tonio Borg
- Yemen – Minister for Foreign Affairs Abu Bakr al-Qirbi
- Israel – Deputy Prime Minister Avigdor Liberman
- Cambodia – Deputy Prime Minister Hor Namhong
- Bahamas – Minister for Foreign Affairs Brent Symonette
- Myanmar – Minister for Foreign Affairs Nyan Win
- Singapore – Minister for Foreign Affairs George Yeo
- Syrian Arab Republic – Walid Muallem
- Ghana – Minister for Foreign Affairs Muhammad Mumuni
- Pakistan – Minister for Foreign Affairs Shah Mehmood Qureshi
- Greece – Minister for Foreign Affairs Dimitris Droutsas
- Mauritius – Minister for Foreign Affairs Arvin Boolell
- Bulgaria – Minister for Foreign Affairs Nickolay Mladenov
- Eritrea – Minister for Foreign Affairs Osman Saleh Mohammed
- Equatorial Guinea – Minister for Foreign Affairs Pastor Micha Ondo Bile

Afternoon Session

- Libya – Minister for Foreign Affairs Moussa Koussa
- Oman – Secretary for Foreign Affairs Badr bin Hamad Al Busaidi
- Liechtenstein – Minister of External Affairs Aurelia Frick
- Tunisia – Minister for Foreign Affairs Kamel Morjane
- Indonesia – Minister for Foreign Affairs Marty Natalegawa
- United Arab Emirates – Minister for Foreign Affairs Abdullah bin Zayed Al Nahyan
- Chad – Minister for Foreign Affairs Moussa Faki
- Barbados – Minister for Foreign Affairs and Foreign Trade Maxine Pamela Ometa McClean
- Mali – Minister for Foreign Affairs Moctar Ouane
- Belarus – Deputy Minister for Foreign Affairs Sergei Aleinik
- Angola – Secretary of State Georges Rebelo Chicoti
- Mexico – Permanent Representative Claude Heller
- Denmark – Permanent Representative Carsten Staur
- Burkina Faso – Permanent Representative Michel Kafando
- Tuvalu – Chairman Afelee Pita
- Sweden – Chairman Marten Grunditz
- Guatemala – Chairman Gert Rosenthal
- Cabo Verde – Permanent Representative Antonio Pedro Monteiro Lima

Right of Reply
Ethiopia
Ethiopia used its Right of Reply to respond to statements made by Eritrea in its general debate speech before the Assembly. Eritrea, in its speech, touched upon the Eritrean–Ethiopian border conflict. It called Ethiopia's occupation of Eritrean lands illegal, and denounced the United Nations' silence on the issue.

Ethiopia responded by stating that Eritrea itself was guilty of occupying the sovereign lands of other states, including occupations in Sudan, Yemen, Djibouti and Ethiopia. The delegation further stated that Ethiopia had been ready to initiate demarcation talks with Eritrea, but that Eritrea had continued to refuse based on their claims that Ethiopia was occupying their land. Finally, it stated that the Ethiopian-Eritrean Boundary Commission had no mandate to transfer territory between the two parties, and that it was up to the parties to reach a final agreement. It claimed that Eritrea was refusing on the pretext that Ethiopia was occupying Eritrean land, and that this refusal allowed Eritrea to create a pretext for further aggression.

Islamic Republic of Iran
The Islamic Republic of Iran used its Right of Reply to respond to statements made by the United Arab Emirates (UAE) in its general debate speech before the Assembly. The UAE, in its speech, demanded the return of the occupied islands of the Greater and Lesser Tunbs and Abu Musa, which were disputed between Iran and the United Arab Emirates. It also asked Member States to urge Iran to engage in the peaceful initiatives of the United Arab Emirates in order to resolve the issue, either by bi-lateral negotiations or by referral to the International Court of Justice.

Iran responded by rejecting the UAE's remarks calling them unacceptable claims against Iranian territorial integrity. It further stated that the Islands were eternal parts of Iranian territory, and consequently fell under its sovereignty.

Eritrea
Eritrea used its Right of Reply to respond to Ethiopia's Right of Reply. It accused that Ethiopia of making several unfounded accusations that contributed nothing to the peace and security of the region. It continued by stating that the Boundary Commission had already demarcated the border and that Ethiopia was in defiance of the commission's ruling by continuing to occupy Eritrean territory. Finally, it stated that Ethiopia's disdain for international law was the reason that the conflict could not end, and that Ethiopia had to face up to its obligations if it was at all interested in the peace and stability of the region.

United Arab Emirates
The United Arab Emirates used its Right of Reply to respond to the Islamic Republic of Iran's Right of Reply. It expressed its regret that Iran had rejected numerous peace initiatives that had attempted to resolve the issue peacefully, while further rejecting Iran's occupation of the islands. Finally, it once again called upon the international community to support the Emirati position to attempt to bring about a comprehensive and just settlement.

Cuba
Cuba used its Right of Reply to respond to statements made by Sweden in its general debate speech before the Assembly. Sweden, in its speech, called upon the international community to uphold human rights as enshrined in the Charter of the United Nations and the Universal Declaration of Human Rights. One of the rights specifically mentioned was the freedom of expression, and how it must be protected even in the era of information technology. It further touched upon the situation in various countries, including Cuba, and stated that the harassment and jailing of journalists and bloggers had to be stopped. Finally, it called on the international community to addresses the issue of the violation of freedom of expression.

Cuba responded by criticizing Sweden by bringing up its own human rights violations. From allowing the Central Intelligence Agency to spy on its own citizens, to the situation of prostitution in Sweden and of the assaults, including sexual abuse, against women and girls. It finished by accusing Sweden of trying to mislead the General Assembly by pointing fingers.

Egypt
Egypt also used its Right of Reply to respond to the statements made by Sweden. It called the claims surrounding the situation of the freedom of expression Egypt as baseless. It brought up the fact that there are over 300 newspapers and journals published daily in Egypt, representing views from every corner of Egyptian society and political life. Additionally, it reminded Sweden that freedom of expression is guaranteed in the Egyptian constitution, and that Egypt has been in the lead of political reform in the Middle East. Finally, it asked that Sweden learn the difference between freedom of expression and insulting prophets and defaming religions.

China
China also used its Right of Reply to respond to the statements made by Sweden. It rejected the unfounded accusations made by the Sweden, further stating that the Chinese Government had always protected the economic, social and cultural rights of its all of its citizens. It also mentioned some of Sweden's own incidents of human rights violations, calling the situation sombre. Finally, it mentioned Sweden's double standard of accusing other states of human rights violations, when it has not mentioning the human rights situation in its own country.

Islamic Republic of Iran
The Islamic Republic of Iran used its Right of Reply to the statements made by both Sweden and Ireland in their general debate speeches before the Assembly. It stated that Sweden and Ireland were upholding double standards, as they were attacking Iran for its supposed human rights violations, while ignoring their own record of human rights violations. It also stated the two countries should stop abusing the rostrum of United Nations to level politically motivated, distorted and false accusations against others."

=== 29 September 2010 ===
Morning Session

- Belize – Minister for Foreign Affairs Wilfred Elrington
- India – Minister of External Affairs S. M. Krishna
- Uruguay – Minister for Foreign Affairs Luis Leonardo Almagro
- Côte d'Ivoire – Minister for Foreign Affairs Jean-Marie Kacou Gervais
- Ethiopia – Minister for Foreign Affairs Seyoum Mesfin
- Paraguay – Minister of External Affairs Héctor Lacognata
- Thailand – Minister for Foreign Affairs Kasit Piromya
- Holy See – Secretary of Relations with States Dominique Mamberti
- Guinea – Minister for Foreign Affairs Bakary Fofana
- Bhutan – Secretary for Foreign Affairs Daw Penjo
- North Korea – Vice Minister for Foreign Affairs Pak Kil-yon
- Russian Federation – Permanent Representative Vitaly Churkin

Afternoon Session

- Republic of Moldova – Chairman Alexandru Cujba
- Monaco – Permanent Representative Isabelle Picco
- Tonga – Chairman Sonatane Tuʻa Taumoepeau-Tupou
- Saint Vincent and the Grenadines – Chairman Camillo Gonsalves
- Venezuela (Bolivarian Republic of) – Chairman Jorge Valero Briceño
- Norway – Permanent Representative Tine Mørch Smith
- Poland – Chairman Witold Sobków
- United Nations – President of the 65th Session of the General Assembly Joseph Deiss (Closing)

Right of Reply

Eritrea
Eritrea used its Right of Reply to respond to statements made by Ethiopia in its general debate speech before the Assembly. Ethiopia, in its speech, stated that, in regards to security in the Horn of Africa region, that Eritrea had played a destructive role since its independence. The delegation further added that it was unfortunate that the Security Council was not taking necessary steps in order to get Eritrea to comply with United Nations Security Council Resolution 1907, accusing Eritrea of being the "principal architect of the complicated situation in Somalia" through its support of Al-Shabaab.

Eritrea responded by accusing Ethiopia of using its speech to divert attention from its refusal to withdraw its troops from southern Eritrean territories, and of its failed attempt to support the Transitional Federal Government of Somalia. The Delegation continued by stating that Ethiopia was using Eritrea as a scapegoat for the problems it had created Somalia. It further pointed out that it was Ethiopia's campaign in Somalia in 2006 that contributed to the rise of the Al-Shabaab, and not Eritrean support as Ethiopia claimed. Finally, it stated that Ethiopia had created one of the biggest humanitarian crises African had ever seen and that Ethiopia had significantly contributed to the destabilization of the Somalia. Eritrea finished by calling on Ethiopia to end its occupation of Eritrean territories in order to ensure stability in the region.

Ethiopia
Ethiopia used its Right of Reply to respond to Eritrea's Right of Reply. It reiterated that Eritrea was destabilizing the Horn of Africa, and that their sponsorship of various terrorist groups in the region had played a role. The Delegation further stated that despite Eritrea's role in the destabilization of the region, and the passage of UNSC Resolution 1907, that the international community had failed to take tangible measures to stop Eritrea. Ethiopia then accused the Eritrean regime of waging a campaign to deflect attention from itself by bringing up the border dispute between the two states, and making Eritrea out to be an "underdog." Finally, it finished by calling upon the international community to exert more pressure on Eritrea to comply with UNSC Resolution 1907.

Pakistan
Pakistan used its Right of Reply to respond to statements made by India in its general debate speech before the Assembly. India, in its speech, stated that, Jammu and Kashmir is an integral part of India, and that it had been the target of Pakistan-sponsored militancy and terrorism. India called upon Pakistan to fulfill its commitment not to allow territory under its control to be used for terrorism directed against India. India finished by stating that Pakistan could not impart lessons on democracy and human rights to the international community as long as it continued to allow terrorism against India to remain unchecked.

Pakistan responded by stating that Jammu and Kashmir is not an integral part of India, but rather, an internationally recognized disputed territory that is still being considered by the United Nations. It also mentioned that the United Nations had adopted more than a dozen resolutions calling for the settlement of the Jammu and Kashmir dispute through a free and fair plebiscite. Pakistan then reminded India that its first Prime Minister, Jawaharlal Nehru, had said in a speech on 2 January 1952 that "Kashmir is not the property of either India or Pakistan. It belongs to the Kashmiri people. When Kashmir acceded to India, we made it clear to the leaders of the Kashmiri people that we would ultimately abide by the verdict of their plebiscite." Pakistan stated that India had continued to violate several United Nations resolutions, and failed to fulfill the commitments made by its leaders.

Pakistan then stated that India had used their speech to distract the international community from their human rights violations of Kashmiris in Indian-administered Kashmir. It brought up statements by Amnesty International and Human Rights Watch which both had called on the Indian authorities to take steps to ensure respect for the right to life of Kashmiri demonstrators, as well as to respect the United Nations Basic Principles on the Use of Force and Firearms by Law Enforcement Officials. Finally, Pakistan accused India of maligning Pakistan on the issue of terrorism in order to conceal the state terrorism it had been using to stifle Kashmiri voices demanding the right to self-determination.

Azerbaijan
Azerbaijan used its Right of Reply to respond to statements made by Armenia in its general debate speech before the Assembly. Armenia, in its speech, stated that Azerbaijan was a threat to regional peace and security through its continued denial of the right to self-determination by the people of Nagorno-Karabakh by rejecting the 1991 independence referendum. Armenia continued by accusing Azerbaijan of attempting to cleanse the people of Nagorno-Karabakh from their ancestral home via a brutal war. Azerbaijan was then accused of undermining the peace process by misleading the international community by distorting of the nature of the conflict, by undermining the Minsk Group by rejecting its proposed principles and by rejecting proposals to come to an agreement on the non-use of force or threat of force. Armenia finished by condemning Azerbaijan's destruction of thousands of cultural and religious heritage objects in the Nagorno-Karabakh region.

Azerbaijan responded by accusing Armenia of outrageous racist ideology, as well as by pointing out its annexationist intentions and unwillingness to settle the Armenian-Azerbaijan conflict in accordance with international law. It further accused Armenia of unleashing the war, attacking Azerbaijan, occupying its ancestral territories, carrying out ethnic cleansing and establishing a subordinate separatist entity on captured Azerbaijani territory along ethnic lines. Azerbaijan also called into the question the legitimacy of the 1991 referendum, claiming that it was not recognized by the Security Council and the General Assembly. Finally, it called on Armenia to realize that in order for peace to be achieved, there was no alternative but to put a prompt end to its illegal occupation of Azerbaijani territory.

Armenia
Armenia used its Right of Reply to respond to Azerbaijan's Right of Reply. It replied by stating that claims of any military expansionism by Armenia made by Azerbaijan were totally misleading; asserting that Armenia had never started any aggression whatsoever. Armenia continued by pinning the full blame of the Nagorno-Karabakh conflict on Azerbaijan, accusing them of starting a full-scale war against the people of Nagorno-Karabakh, thus forcing them to take up arms in order to protect their lives and homes. Finally, it finished by stating that Armenia had fully complied with the various Security Council resolutions concerning the conflict, whereas Azerbaijan had not, and was attempting to find a peaceful solution to the conflict.

Republic of Korea
The Republic of Korea (ROK) used its Right of Reply to respond to statements made by the Democratic People's Republic of Korea (DPRK) in its general debate speech before the Assembly. The DPRK, in its speech, stated that, its efforts towards peaceful development were being constantly threatened and undermined. It then commented on the situation regarding the Cheonan incident, and how sabre-rattling and arms build-ups by the United States and the ROK were leading the Korean peninsula to brink of war. It further rejected the findings of the international team that was assembled to investigate the sinking, citing the ROK's refusal to allow a team from the DPRK to investigate the incident for scientific and objective verification. Finally, the DPRK castigated the ROK, accusing them of rejecting reunification efforts by creating tension on the Korean peninsula by waging war exercises with outside forces and by stepping up an atmosphere of war against their fellow countrymen.

The ROK responded by stating the findings of the joint investigation group on the sinking of the Cheonanwere the result of a thorough, objective and scientific investigation, and that its findings were endorsed by the international community in a presidential statement adopted by the Security Council on 9 July 2010 which stated that the "Security Council underscores the importance of preventing further such attacks or hostilities against the Republic of Korea or in the region." It continued by stating the DPRK's attack constituted a grave violation of the Armistice Agreement and the principles of the United Nations Charter. Finally, it refuted the DPRK's claims that it was a nuclear-weapon state, citing reports of the eighth Non-Proliferation Treaty Review Conference.

Eritrea
Eritrea used its Right of Reply to respond to Ethiopia's Right of Reply. It stated that the key to resolving the problems between Eritrea and Ethiopia was the withdrawal of Ethiopian soldiers and institutions from Eritrean sovereign territories. It then mentioned that the Eritrea-Ethiopia Boundary Commission had already delimited and demarcated the border, and that Ethiopia's dishonoring of the commission's agreement by refusing to withdrawal its soldiers was irresponsible and shameful. Finally, it reminded the General Assembly that Ethiopia continues to be the only constant factor throughout the political crisis in Somalia, and that Ethiopia's continued meddling in the affairs of Somalia was dangerous to Somalis and to the rest of the region.

India
India used its Right of Reply to respond to Pakistan's Right of Reply. India responded by stating that in its speech, Pakistan had made various baseless and false allegations against India. It continued by reminding Pakistan that it should concentrate on addressing the enormous challenges confronting it, such as terrorism, extremism and sectarianism, rather than making unsolicited remarks about the internal affairs of other states in an attempt to divert attention. Finally, it finished by stating that the Indian Constitution guaranteed the fundamental rights of all Indians, including those in Jammu and Kashmir, and that, contrary to claims made by Pakistan, free and fair elections in Jammu and Kashmir had been regularly held allowing people in the region to exercised their right to franchise in order to elect their representatives.

Azerbaijan
Azerbaijan used its Right of Reply to respond to Armenia's Right of Reply. It stated the United Nations should only be resorted to by Member States in accordance with the purposes and principles of the Organization and not misused for political advantage. It then accused Armenia of using the Organization to advocate for a culture of impunity and promote dangerous ideas of racial, ethnic and religious superiority. It further asserted that it considered Armenia's behavior an open challenge to the conflict settlement process and a threat to international and regional peace and security. Finally, it asked for the international communities help to persuade Armenia to cease its destructive policies, respect the generally accepted norms and principles of international law and negotiate in good faith with a view to achieving a durable solution to the conflict.

Democratic People's Republic of Korea
The DPRK used its Right of Reply to respond to ROK's Right of Reply. It stated the ROK, in regards to the sinking of the Cheonan incident, was attempting to bring to the attention of the General Assembly an issue which not even the Security Council had prepared an appropriate judgement.

It continued by reiterating that the DPRK had nothing to do with the sinking, and that the evidence presented by the ROK in the Joint Civilian-Military Investigation Group was not scientifically based or objective, and that it did nothing more but to raise conclusive doubts. It then mentioned that the ROK had rejected its offer to dispatch its own inspection group in order to verify the investigation's results objectively and scientifically, instead insisting that the international community should only accept the ROK's investigation results. It then stated that if the ROK had nothing to hide, then there was no reason for them not to accept the DPRK's inspection group to verify the investigation results, and that as long as the ROK refused to accept the inspection group, suspicion would continue to grow.

Finally, it stated that it did not need the ROK, or any country, to recognize or accept the status of the DPRK as a nuclear State, and that their nuclear program was no created in order to intimidate, but rather as a means to deter attacks from the outside.

Ethiopia
Ethiopia used its Right of Reply to touch upon the situation with Eritrea. It stated that both Ethiopia and Eritrea had expressed their views on the topic, and that they both had been throwing accusations and allegations at each other for almost a decade, to no avail. It continued by talking about the situation in Somalia and called upon members of the Assembly to refer to the outcome of the Summit on Somalia convened by Secretary General Ban Ki-moon, which imposed sanction on Eritrea, and not Ethiopia. It then talked about how the African Union and the international community had both sanctioned Eritrea, stating that it would be unlikely that they had got it all wrong and that Eritrea had got it right. With regards to demarcation, Ethiopia stated that the only way forward was through dialogue.

Pakistan
Pakistan used to Right of Reply to respond to India's Right of Reply. It started by stating that India's arguments regarding elections in Indian-administered Kashmir had been rejected by both the people of the region, as well as by the international community. It then stated that Pakistan did not interfere in the internal affairs of other countries, and that the Jammu and Kashmir issue was not an internal Indian matter. It continued by stating that due to the fact that Pakistan was a stakeholder in the Jammu and Kashmir dispute, it retained the right to raise this issue in all international forums, saying it would continue to support the people of Jammu and Kashmir morally, politically and diplomatically.

Pakistan then continued by stating that despite decades of repression and human rights violations at the hands of Indian forces, the people of Jammu and Kashmir refused to accept any solution other than the exercise of their right to self-determination. It then stated that the issue of Jammu and Kashmir should not be used as a tool of State politics. Finally, it finished by stating that Pakistan remained committed to a peaceful resolution of all issues with India, including the issue of Jammu and Kashmir.

Armenia
Armenia used to Right of Reply to respond to its situation with Azerbaijan. It started by stating that its previous statement were intended to sincerely address the burning issues of the people of the region. It continued by stating that its previous statement applied to all national and ethnic groups living in the Nagorno-Karabakh Republic. Finally, it stated that the comments by Azerbaijan were politically motivated, and in no way served the goals of the Assembly, which are aimed at uniting all nations.

India
India used to Right of Reply to reject all untenable and unsolicited remarks from Pakistan.

Viet Nam
Viet Nam used its Right of Reply to respond to statements made by Sweden in its general debate speech before the Assembly. Sweden, in its speech, stated that the harassment and jailing of journalists and bloggers in various countries, including Viet Nam, had to stop. It also called upon the international community to address the issue of the violation of freedom of expression in the digital age.

Viet Nam responded by stating that it was open to all comments concerning the country, as long as these comments were constructive and well-informed. It continued by stating that Sweden's comments about the jailing and harassment of journalists in Viet Nam, however, were uninformed, misinformed and ungrounded. Finally it stated that these comments were contrary to the tradition of friendship between the two countries on the basis of mutual respect and respect for international law.

== See also ==
- List of UN General Assembly sessions
- List of General debates of the United Nations General Assembly
