= Carles Font-Rossell =

Andorran diplomat

H.E. Carles Font-Rossell (L'Armany de Canillo)

Ciutadà d'Andorra
- Incumbent
- Assumed office September 2007
- Preceded by: Jelena V. Pia-Comella

Andorra Ambassador to the United States
- In office 14 March 2008 – 2 November 2009
- Preceded by: Jelena V. Pia-Comella
- Succeeded by: Narcís Casal de Fonsdeviela

Personal details
- Born: 26 December 1967 (age 58) Canillo, Andorra

Carles Font-Rossell (born 26 December 1967, in Canillo, Andorra) is an Andorran diplomat who served as Permanent Representative to the United Nations for Andorra and, from 14 March 2008, as Ambassador of Andorra to the United States. He was succeeded in both positions by Narcís Casal de Fonsdeviela.

== Education ==
Font-Rossell holds a Bachelor of Business Administration from the European University of Barcelona, Spain. He speaks four languages.

== Career ==
Prior to his appointment to the United Nations, Font-Rossell was the Minister of Youth and Sports for his country, beginning in 2005. From 2003 to 2005, he held the chairmanship of Andorra's Rugby Federation. He was a Canillo Parish Council member from 1996 to 1999. In addition to his public service, he owns several hotels in Andorra.

== See also ==
- List of current permanent representatives to the United Nations
