= Sixty-fifth session of the United Nations General Assembly =

U.N. General assembly session

- 14 September 2010 – 12 September 2011 65th session 65th general debate
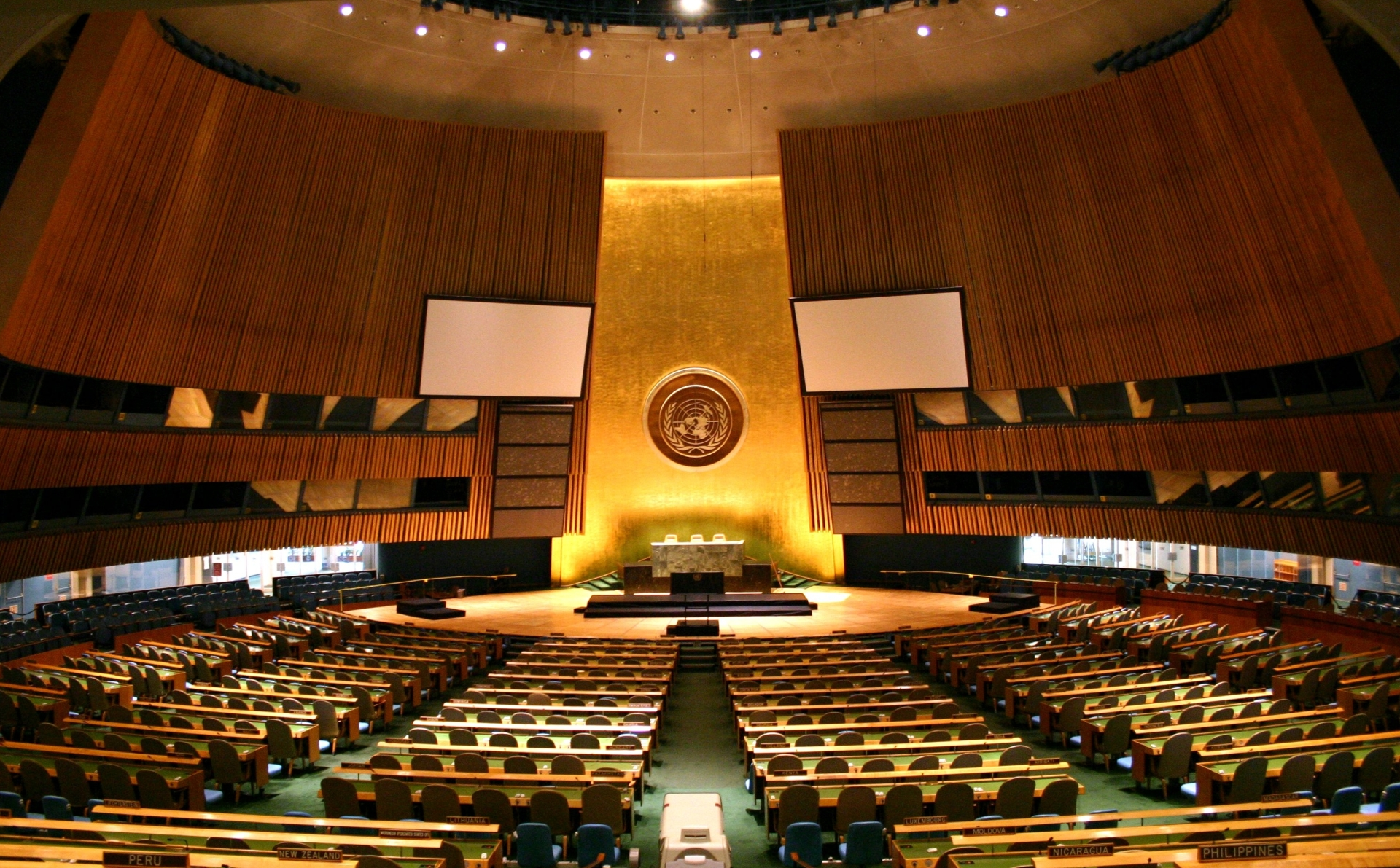
- General Assembly Hall at United Nations Headquarters, New York City
- Host country: United Nations
- Cities: New York City
- Venues: General Assembly Hall at the United Nations Headquarters
- Participants: United Nations Member States
- President: Joseph Deiss
- Secretary-General: Ban Ki-moon
- Website: www.un.org/en/ga/65/

The sixty-fifth session of the United Nations General Assembly was the session of the United Nations General Assembly that ran from 14 September 2010 to 12 September 2011.

The theme of the session was "Reaffirming the central role of the United Nations in global governance."

== Organisation ==
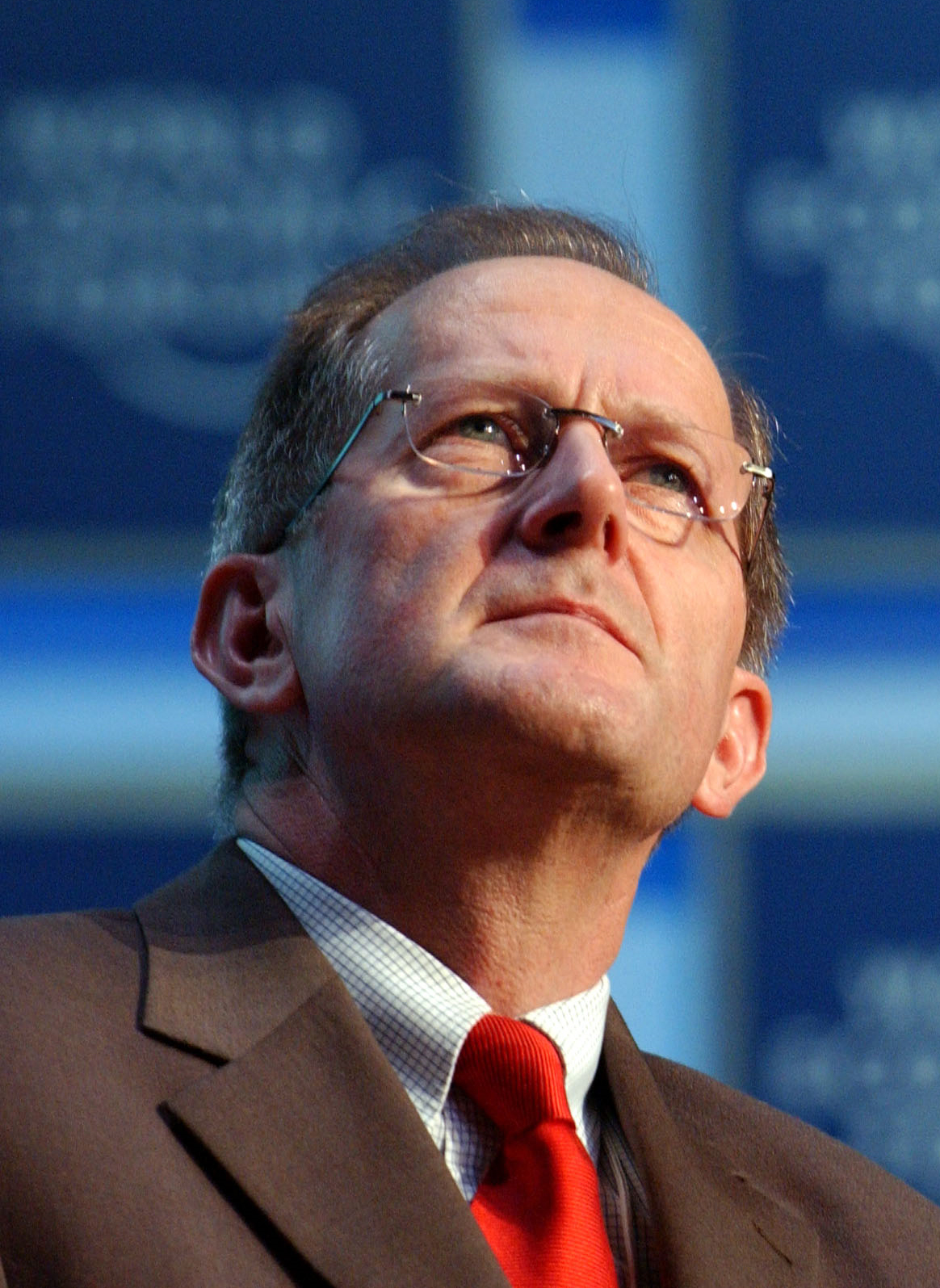
President of the 65th Session, Joseph Deiss

=== President ===
On 11 June 2010, Swiss diplomat and politician Joseph Deiss of was elected by acclamation to the position of President of the General Assembly. Mr. Deiss was elected from the Western European and Others Group (WEOG).

In his first speech as President-elect of the General Assembly, Mr. Deiss laid out some of his priorities for the session. These included: the achievement of the Millennium Development Goals, as well as sustainable economic growth. Additionally, he stated that the General Assembly would need to address: climate change, food security, reconstruction of fragile and post-conflict States, human rights, humanitarian aid and disarmament.

=== Vice-Presidents ===
The following were appointed to be the Session's vice-presidents on the 11 June 2010:

The five permanent members of the Security Council:

- China
- France
- Russia
- United Kingdom of Great Britain and Northern Ireland
- United States of America

As well as the following nations:

- Afghanistan
- Belarus
- Botswana
- Ecuador
- Equatorial Guinea
- Gambia (Republic of The)
- Indonesia
- Luxembourg
- Mauritania
- Nicaragua
- Pakistan
- Senegal
- Sudan
- Suriname
- United Arab Emirates
- Uzbekistan

=== Committees ===
First Committee (Disarmament and International Security)
Name	Country	Position
H.E. Mr. Miloš Koterec	Slovakia	Chairperson
Mr. Hossam Eldeen Aly	Egypt	Vice-Chair
Mr. Herman Schaper	Netherlands	Vice-Chair
Mr. Carlos Sorreta	Philippines	Vice-Chair
Mr. Enrique Ochoa	Mexico	Rapporteur

Second Committee (Economic and Financial)
Name	Country	Position
H.E. Ms. Enkhtsetseg Ochir	Mongolia	Chairperson
Mr. Erik Lundberg	Finland	Vice-Chair
Ms. Csilla Wurtz	Hungary	Vice-Chair
Mr. Jean Claudy Pierre	Haiti	Vice-Chair
Mr. Paul Empole	Democratic Republic of the Congo	Rapporteur

Third Committee (Social, Humanitarian and Cultural)
Name	Country	Position
H.E. Mr. Michel Tommo Monthé	Cameroon	Chairperson
Ms. Margareta Ploder	Austria	Vice-Chair
Ms. Maria Luz Melon	Argentina	Vice-Chair
Mr. Waheed A. Al-Shami	Yemen	Vice-Chair
Mr. Asif Garayev	Azerbaijan	Rapporteur

Fourth Committee (Special Political and Decolonization)
Name	Country	Position
H.E. Mr. Chitsaka Chipaziwa	Zimbabwe	Chairperson
Mr. Radoslaw Flisiuk	Poland	Vice-Chair
Mr. David Windsor	Australia	Vice-Chair
Ms. Marcela Zamora	Costa Rica	Vice-Chair
Mr. Mohammad Wali Naeemi	Afghanistan	Rapporteur

Fifth Committee (Administrative and Budgetary)
Name	Country	Position
H.E. Mr. Gert Rosenthal	Guatemala	Chairperson
Mr. Muhammad Irfan Soomro	Pakistan	Vice-Chair
Ms. Ioana Sanda Stoica	Romania	Vice-Chair
Mr. Josiel Motumisi Tawana	South Africa	Vice-Chair
Ms. Nicole Mannion	Ireland	Rapporteur

Sixth Committee (Legal)
Name	Country	Position
H.E. Mrs. Isabelle Picco	Monaco	Chairperson
Mr. Reta Alemu Nega	Ethiopia	Vice-Chair
Mr. Chull-joo Park	Republic of Korea	Vice-Chair
Ms. Eva Šurkova	Slovakia	Vice-Chair
Ms. Glenna Cabello de Daboin	Venezuela	Rapporteur

=== Seat allocation ===
As is tradition, before each session of the General Assembly, the Secretary-General draws lots to determine which Member State would occupy the first seat in the General Assembly Hall for the Session, with other Member States following according to the English translation of their name. For the 65th Session, Guinea was chosen to take the first seat of the General Assembly Chamber.

=== General debate ===
The General Debate of the 65th Session was held between 23 and 29 September 2010, with the exception of the intervening Sunday. At the General debate, Member States have the opportunity to lay out the issues that are most concerning to them, as well as their hopes as to what the General Assembly will do during the Session.

The order of speakers is given first to Member States, then Observer States and supranational bodies. Speakers are put on a speaking list in the order of their request, with special consideration for ministers and other government officials of similar or higher rank. According to the rules in place for the General Debate, the statements should be in one of the United Nations official languages of Arabic, Chinese, English, French, Russian or Spanish, and will be translated by the United Nations translators.

== Resolutions ==
- United Nations General Assembly Resolution 65/265: suspended the right of Libya to take part in the Human Rights Council. Adopted on March 1, 2011 without vote, the resolution was passed in response to Muammar Gaddafi's treatment of protesters in the 2011 Libyan civil war.

== See also ==
- List of UN General Assembly sessions
- List of General debates of the United Nations General Assembly
