= Delegation of the European Union to the United Kingdom =

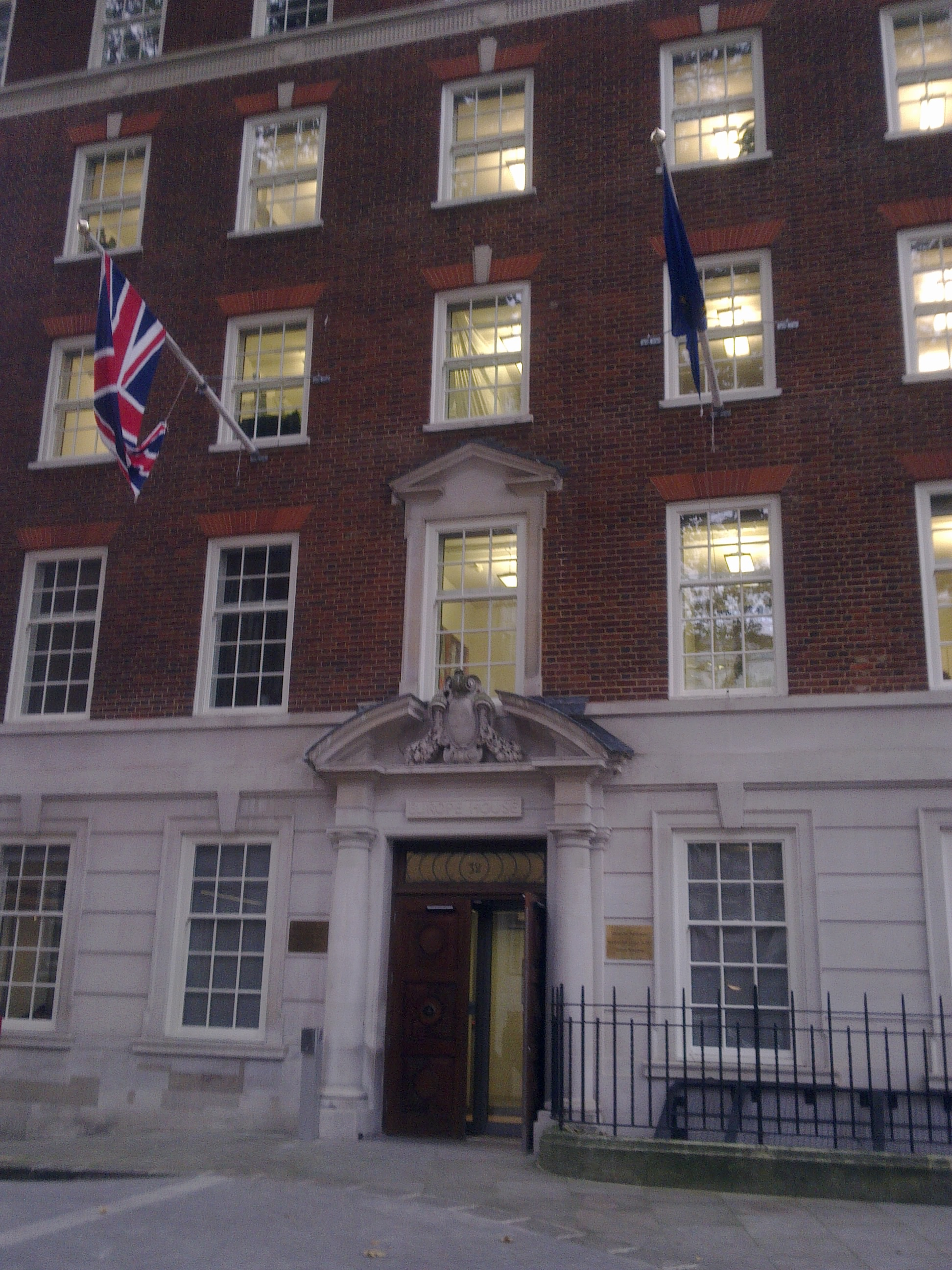
- Location: Westminster, London
- Address: Europe House, 32 Smith Square, London, SW1P 3EU
- Coordinates: 51°29′44.3″N 0°7′39.4″W
- Ambassador: Jukka Salovaara

The Delegation of the European Union to the United Kingdom, formerly known as Representative of the European Union (specifically the Representative of the European Commission and the Representative of the European Parliament) in London are the diplomatic missions of the European Commission and the European Parliament in the United Kingdom.

They are both located in Europe House, 32 Smith Square. The building was formerly the Conservative Party's Central Office from the late 1950s until 2004 and was famous as the place where the Conservatives planned and celebrated their election victories. It was then left vacant until 2009 when the EU chose it as their new London office, along with a new personalised postcode – SW1P 3EU. There was some criticism of the amount spent by the EU in acquiring and updating the interior of the building, with £20 million spent on purchasing the property and £5 million on revamping the building. It allegedly included the installation of bomb and bullet-proof windows.

As a result of the United Kingdom's withdrawal from the European Union on 31 January 2020, the Representative of the European Union was replaced by the Delegation of the European Union to the United Kingdom.

Since September 2026, the Ambassador of the Delegation of the EU to the UK has been Jukka Salovaara. The representative is referred to as ambassador, even though in the United Kingdom full diplomatic status is only given to representatives of sovereign states instead of international organisations.

== Ambassadors ==
EU Ambassadors to the United Kingdom:

- (Portugal) João Vale de Almeida (2020–2022)
- (Spain) Pedro Serrano (2022–2026)
- (Finland) Jukka Salovaara (2022–2026)

== Gallery ==
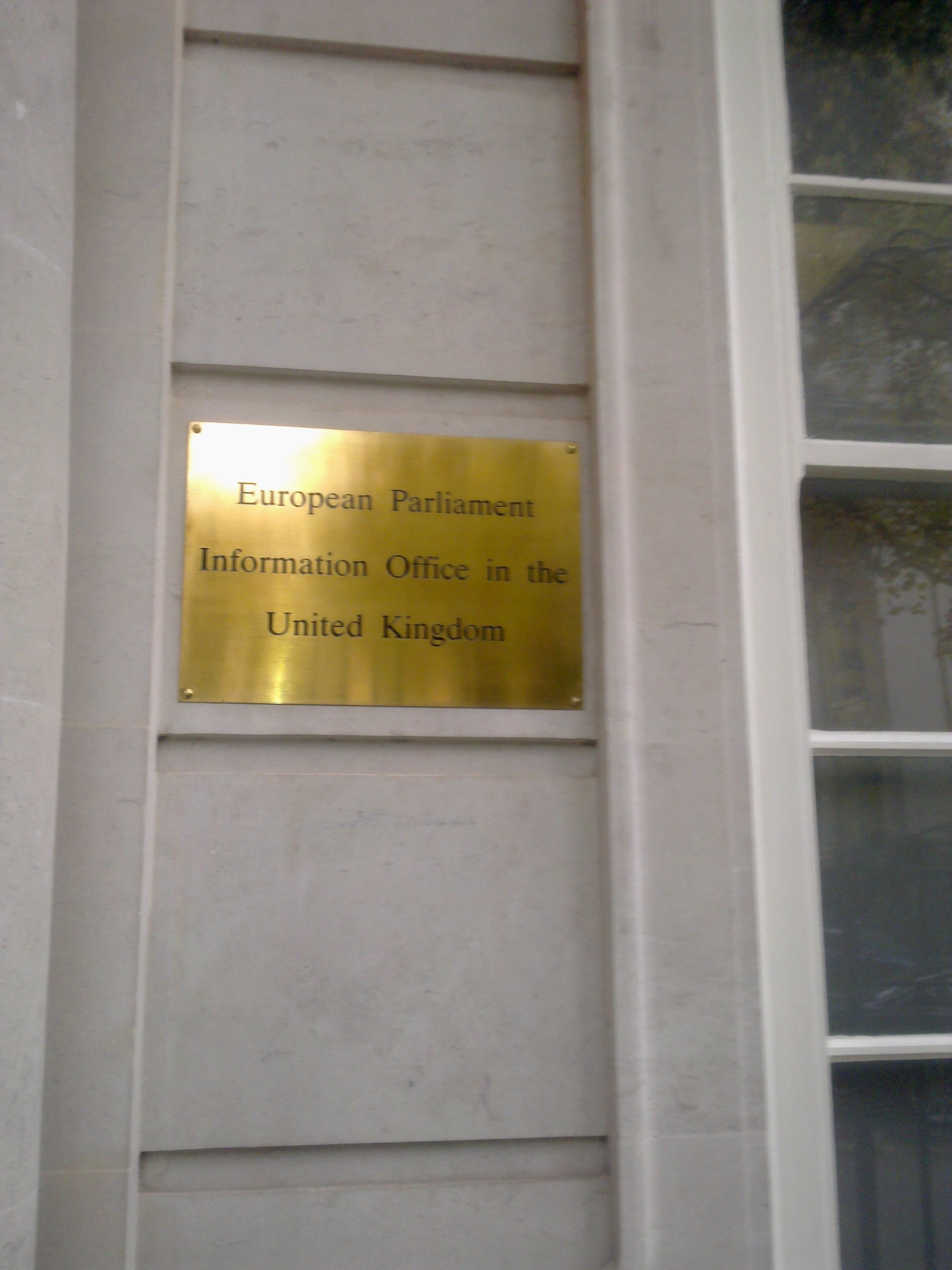
Plaque outside the mission

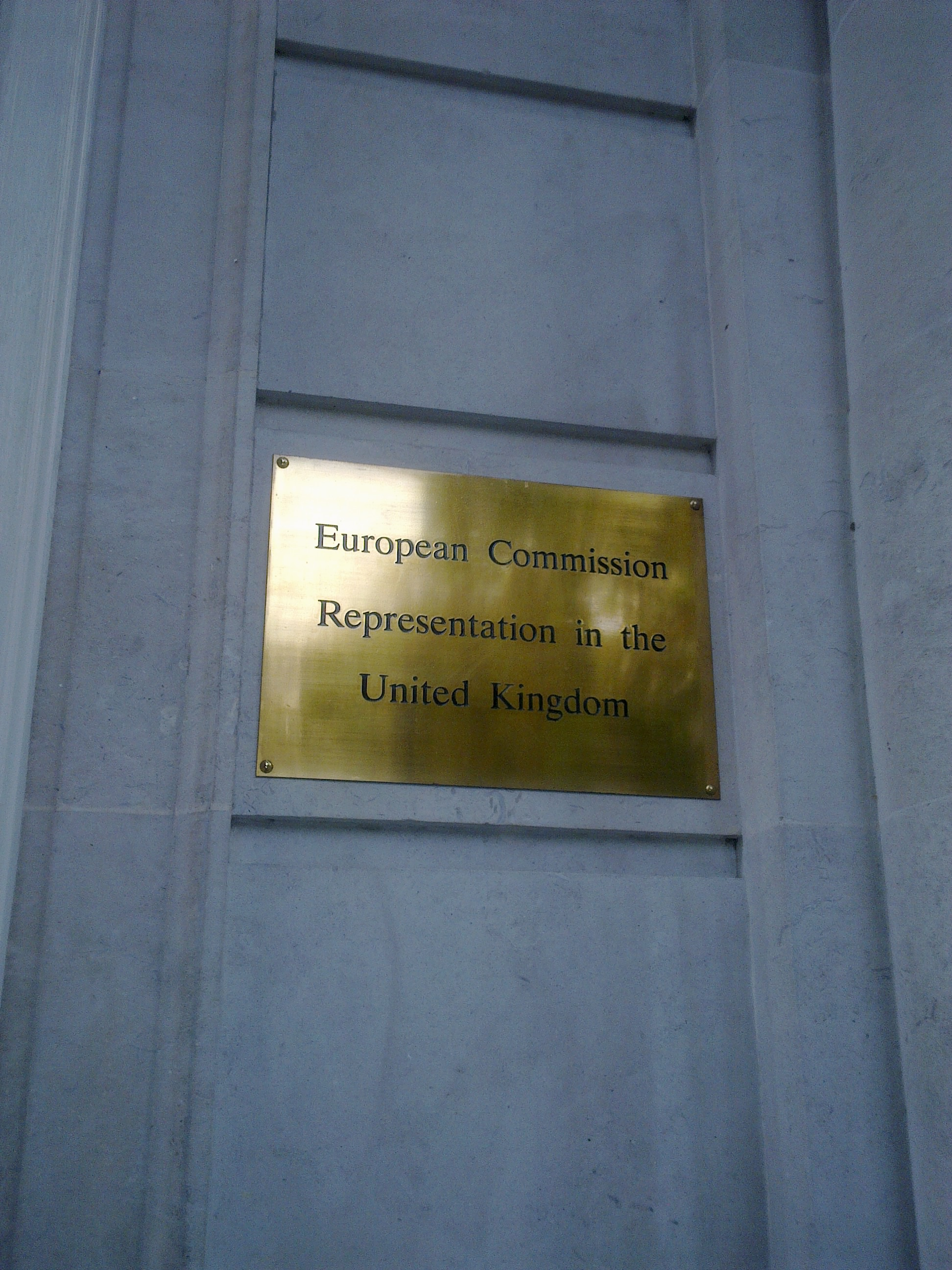
Plaque outside the mission

== See also ==
- United Kingdom–European Union relations
