= Laura Dupuy =

Laura Dupuy may refer to:

- Laura Dupuy Lasserre (born 1967), Uruguayan diplomat
- Laura Martin, comic book colorist who has worked under the name Laura DePuy
