= Elisenda =

Elisenda may refer to:

== People ==
- Elisenda Fábregas (b. 1955), Spanish/American composer
- Elisenda Grigsby, American mathematician
- Elisenda of Montcada (c. 1292 – 1364), queen consort of Aragon
- Elisenda Paluzie (b. 1969), Spanish economist, politician, and professor
- Elisenda Pérez (b. 1975), Spanish swimmer
- Elisenda de Sant Climent (1220–1275), Catalan slave
- Elisenda Vives Balmaña, Andorran diplomat

== Other ==
- Reina Elisenda, subway station in Barcelona, Spain; the street above is named after Elisenda of Montcada
