= Rytis Paulauskas =

Lithuanian diplomat

Permanent Representative of Lithuania to the United Nations
- In office 18 May 2021 – 10 April 2026
- President: See list: Abdulla Shahid; Csaba Kőrösi; Dennis Francis; Philémon Yang
- Preceded by: Audra Plepytė
- Succeeded by: Julius Pranevičius

Director of the Communications and Cultural Diplomacy Department
- In office August 2016 – 18 May 2021
- Minister: Linas Antanas Linkevičius; Gabrielius Landsbergis
- President: Dalia Grybauskaitė; Gitanas Nausėda

Personal details
- Born: 24 May 1969 (age 57) Vilnius, Lithuania
- Spouse: Rūta Paulauskienė
- Children: Gytis Paulauskas
- Education: Vilnius University

Rytis Paulauskas (Lithuanian: [/ˈrɪtɪs pɑʊˈlɑʊskɑs/]; born 24 May 1969) is a Lithuanian lawyer and diplomat. He has held several prominent positions in Lithuania's foreign service, including Permanent Representative of Lithuania to the United Nations from 18 May 2021 until 10 April 2026.

== Education ==
In 1987, Rytis Paulauskas completed his studies at Vilnius S. Nėries Secondary School. He then pursued a law degree at Vilnius University, graduating in 1992. Between 2000 and 2001, he attended the Fletcher School of Law and Diplomacy at Tufts University in the United States, where he earned a Master of Arts degree. Additionally, he studied at the John F. Kennedy School of Government at Harvard University during the same period. He holds the rank of Extraordinary and Plenipotentiary Ambassador.

== Diplomacy ==
Rytis Paulauskas has had a distinguished career in Lithuania's Ministry of Foreign Affairs (MFA) and in various international organizations. He began his diplomatic service in 1991 as Attaché and later Acting Head of the International Organizations Division at the MFA. Between 1993 and 1994, he served as Deputy Permanent Representative of Lithuania to the Council of Europe in Strasbourg. From 1995 to 1996, he was Counsellor at the Permanent Mission of Lithuania to the United Nations in New York. During this period, he was elected Rapporteur of the Sixth (Legal Affairs) Committee of the UN General Assembly.

Between 1996 and 1999, Paulauskas held the position of Deputy Permanent Representative to the United Nations, also serving as Legal Counsellor of the Mission. In 1999, he was appointed Head of the Security Policy Division at the MFA. From 2001 to 2003, he served as Director of the Multilateral Relations Department, followed by a tenure as Director of the Security Policy Department until October 2003.

Between November 2003 and August 2008, Paulauskas was Ambassador and Permanent Representative of Lithuania to the United Nations, OSCE, IAEA, and other international organizations in Vienna. From 2008 to 2012, he served as Director of the OSCE Chairmanship Department and Head of the OSCE Chairmanship Task Force at the MFA. Between August 2012 and July 2016, he was Ambassador and Permanent Representative of Lithuania to the United Nations and other international organizations in Geneva.

In August 2016, Paulauskas was appointed Director of the Communications and Cultural Diplomacy Department at the MFA. Between 2014 and 2015, he served as vice-president of the 102nd Session of the International Labour Conference. In May 2021, he was appointed Ambassador and Permanent Representative of the Republic of Lithuania to the United Nations.

Throughout his career, Paulauskas has been involved in various international initiatives, including serving as President of the executive board of the United Nations Children's Fund (UNICEF) and Chairing the General Working Group of the Wassenaar Arrangement on Export Controls for Conventional Arms and Dual-Use Goods and Technologies.

== Honours ==
- Lithuania:
  - Order for Merits to Lithuania (2002)
