= Andorran permanent representative to the United Nations in New York City =

Coordinates: 40.750756°N 73.969316°W

The Andorran Permanent representative to the Headquarters of the United Nations has his residence in New York City is also accredited as Ambassador to the governments in the United States of America, Canada and the United Mexican States.

- Andorra established relations with the United States in February 1995. It was by means of an exchange of letters. The Andorran government requested to establish full diplomatic relations and the Secretary of State reciprocated by appointing our Consul General in Barcelona as representative of the United States to Andorra for diplomatic and consular affairs. In 1998, with the change of U.S. Ambassador in Madrid, it was agreed the U.S. government would accredit the same Ambassador to Andorra.

== List of heads of mission ==
designated	accredited	ambassador	Observation	List of heads of government of Andorra	Secretary-General of the United Nations	Term end
December 5, 1995	February 6, 1996	Juli Minoves	was 26 years old, the youngest representing a foreign country recorded	Marc Forné Molné	Boutros Boutros-Ghali	
May 16, 2001	September 1, 2007	Jelena Pià	Chargé d'affaires dually credentialed to UN and Embassy	Marc Forné Molné	Kofi Annan	
March 14, 2008	April 9, 2008	Carles Font-Rossell		Albert Pintat	Ban Ki-moon	
November 2, 2009	November 4, 2009	Narcís Casal de Fonsdeviela		Jaume Bartumeu	Ban Ki-moon	
November 3, 2015		Elisenda Vives Balmaña		Antoni Martí	Ban Ki-moon and Antonio Guiterres	
