= Martin Belinga Eboutou =

Cameroonian diplomat (1940–2019)

Martin Belinga Eboutou (17 February 1940 – 8 May 2019) was a Cameroonian political figure and diplomat who was the Director of the Civil Cabinet of the Presidency of Cameroon from 2009 to March 2018. He previously held the same post from 1996 to 1997 and was Cameroon's Permanent Representative to the United Nations from March 1998 to December 2007. Belinga died on 8 May 2019 in Switzerland, aged 79.

== Biography ==
The young Belinga was fatherless early (indeed his father, Tobie Belinga who was a catechist died and is buried at the Catholic Mission in Nden), at the beginning of his secondary studies. His mother (Véronique Eboutou) saw her only son as a future priest and directed him first to the Catholic School of Nden, then to the seminaries of Otélé, Edéa and Akono where he has the opportunity to cross the path of Paul Barthélémy Biya (current President of Cameroon), his seven-year-old elder. He came out with a bachelor's degree.

He pursued his higher education, notably at Lovanium University in Zaire and Paris.

Belinga Eboutou was Director of State Protocol and then Chief of State Protocol at the Presidency from 1989 to 1997, as well as Director of the Civil Cabinet of the Presidency from 19 September 1996 to 8 December 1997. He was then appointed Permanent Representative to the UN, presenting his credentials on 13 March 1998. On 29 January 2001, he was elected as that year's President of the United Nations Economic and Social Council. He was the President of the United Nations Security Council in October 2002. On 6 June 2003, he was elected as Chairperson of the Third Committee of the General Assembly (the Social, Humanitarian, and Cultural Committee). While serving as Permanent Representative to the UN, Belinga Eboutou was also Permanent Representative of Cameroon to the Permanent Mission of the UN in Geneva, as well as Cameroon's Ambassador to Jamaica.

Michel Tommo Monthé was appointed by President Paul Biya to replace Belinga Eboutou as Permanent Representative to the UN on 19 December 2007, while Anatole Marie Nkou was appointed to replace Belinga Eboutou in Geneva. Belinga Eboutou was instead appointed by Biya as Special Adviser to the President of the Republic on 22 December 2007. Biya sent Belinga Eboutou to Senegal from 8 June to 14 June 2009 to discuss the repatriation of the remains of Cameroonian President Ahmadou Ahidjo, who died in exile in Senegal in 1989. He and Ahidjo's family reached an agreement regarding repatriation of the remains. Shortly afterward, Biya appointed him to his former post as Director of the Civil Cabinet of the Presidency on 30 June 2009.

In 2010, he was appointed, cumulatively with his duties of Director of the Civil Cabinet, President of the National Organization Committee of the Cinquantenaries of Independence and Reunification of Cameroon, that the country celebrated in 2010 and 2011. His exit from the government intervened during the ministerial reorganization of March 2, 2018; He was replaced in his post as Director of the Civil Cabinet by Samuel Mvondo Ayolo, until then ambassador of Cameroon in France.
