= Elliston Rahming =

Elliston Rahming is a Bahamian diplomat, criminologist, educator and politician.

== Biography ==
Born in Black Point, South Andros, Bahamas (April 25, 1954) to Daisy and Ishmael Rahming, he attended Bahamas Academy and college preparatory at Rochester Cooperative College in Rochester, NY.

== Education ==
Rahming earned a bachelor's in Sociology from Bethune–Cookman University. He later earned a master's degree in social work and Ph.D. with an emphasis in Criminology from George Warren Brown School of Social Work at Washington University in St. Louis. He is a graduate of the Houston, Texas-based Anger Management Training Institute as an Anger Resolution Therapist and has completed study tours of forty prisons in fifteen countries.

== Career ==
He served as Special Advisors to two Bahamian Prime Ministers: Consultant Advisor on Crime within the Ministry of National Security; executive director of the Y.M.C.A. of Greater Miami; founder and executive director of Respect Academy (now Westminster College) in Nassau, Bahamas; Member of the Bahamas Senate (1992 – 1997); Secretary General of The Progressive Liberal Party; Commissioner (Superintendent) of the Department of Corrections of The Bahamas (2005 – 2013); Bahamas Ambassador to the United Nations and the O.A.S. (Organization of American States); C.E.O. of The InterTech Group (provider of security and investigation services) and President of Common Ground, an Anger Management and Mediation Training Institute. He was National Chairman of the Bahamas Duke of Edinburgh Youth Awards Program (now Governor General's Youth Award Program).

== Honors ==
Rahming is an inductee into the National Deans’ List (U.S.A.); Who's Who Among Students in American Colleges and Universities; listed in Jones Communications’ ‘Bahamian Living Legends’ and selected by Bethune-Cookman University among its “Magnificent 100” – a tribute to the top 100 graduates.

== Publication ==
Greatest Blacks Ever: Top 100 Blacks Who Changed The World for Peace, Progress, Prosperity and Pleasure. Dogear Publishing, 2017.
