= Maria Michail =

Cypriot diplomat (born 1973)

- Μαρία Μιχαήλ
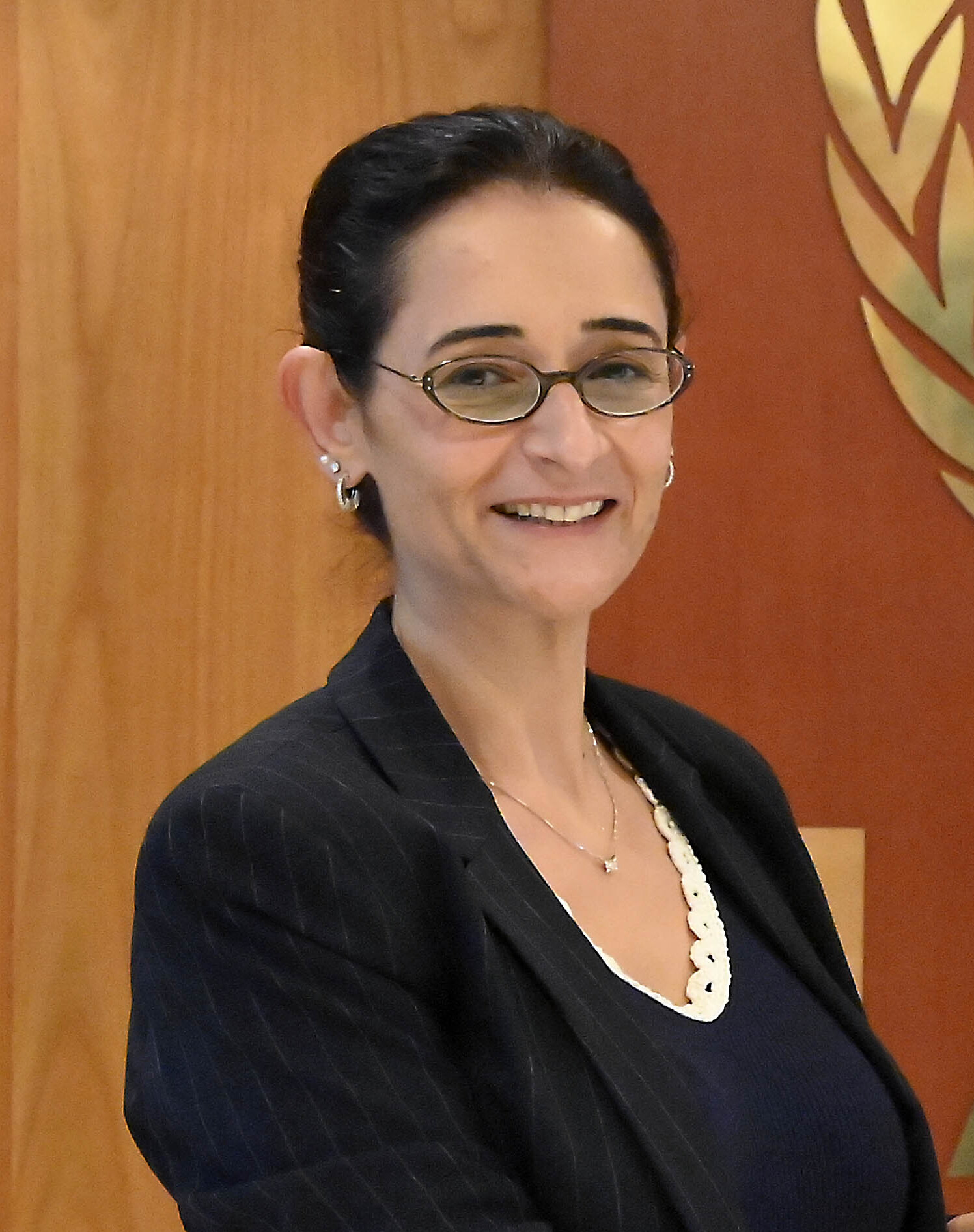
- Maria Michail in 2022

Permanent Representative of Cyprus to the United Nations
- Incumbent
- Assumed office 7 December 2023
- Preceded by: Andreas Hatzichrysanthou

Personal details
- Born: 14 October 1973 (age 52) Nicosia, Cyprus
- Education: University of Leicester; University of Surrey

Maria Michail (Greek: Μαρία Μιχαήλ; born 14 October 1973) is a Cypriot diplomat, permanent representative of Cyprus to the United Nations since 2023. She previously served as ambassador to Austria and Slovenia, and to the Organization for Security and Co-operation in Europe.

== Early life ==
Michail was born on 14 October 1973 in Nicosia, Cyprus. In 1994, she obtained a degree in political science from the University of Leicester and in 1995 a master's degree in European Studies from the University of Surrey.

== Career ==
She joined the diplomatic corps in 1997 and her first posting was at the Cypriot Embassy in Washington DC in 2000. Between 2003 and 2006, she was Deputy High Commissioner in London, and between 2006 and 2007, she worked as assistant of the Minister of Foreign Affairs. Michail was appointed Deputy Permanent Representative to the Cyprus Mission to the United Nations at Geneva in 2009, holding the position until 2012.

That year, she was appointed High Commissioner to India in 2012 and three years later, back in Cyprus, she was appointed Head of the Department of Eastern Europe, Western Balkans and Central Asia at the Ministry of Foreign Affairs.

She headed the Crisis Management Department of the Ministry of Foreign Affairs between 2017 and 2019 and in 2018 she was Director of the Cyprus and Turkey Directorate. From 2022 to 2023 she was Cyprus' Ambassador to Austria and Slovenia, and to the OSCE.

Maria Michail succeeded Andreas Hatzichrysanthou, who retired, as the first permanent representative of the Republic of Cyprus to the United Nations in December 2023, and presented her credentials to Secretary-General of the United Nations António Guterres on 7 December 2023.

During her work for the United Nations, she emphasised that her country supported peacekeeping reform efforts and the implementation of the Women, Peace and Security Agenda, and welcomed the growing efforts to increase women's participation in UN peacekeeping operations. She particularly emphasised that the Republic of Cyprus, as one of the few UN member states, had experience as the host country of one of the world's oldest peacekeeping operations and had been the victim of foreign invasion and illegal military occupation. Michail also confirmed that it was necessary to maintain a United Nations peacekeeping to prevent the resurgence of conflicts and ensure the peaceful resolution of disputes, as well as to support UN peacekeeping missions, especially in view of the constantly evolving challenges.

== Personal life ==
Michail is married.
