= Abdulaziz Alwasil =

Saudi Arabian diplomat (born 1967)

His Excellency Abdulaziz Alwasil
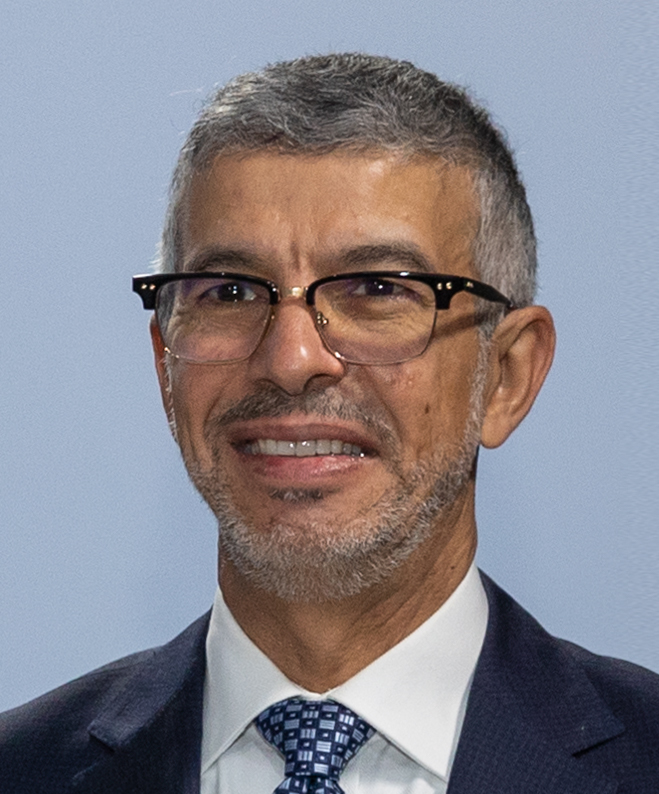
- Alwasil in 2021

Permanent Representative of Saudi Arabia to the United Nations in New York
- Incumbent
- Assumed office July 2022
- Appointed by: Salman of Saudi Arabia
- Preceded by: Abdallah Al-Mouallimi

Permanent Representative of Saudi Arabia to the United Nations in Geneva
- In office November 2016 – July 2022

Personal details
- Born: Abdul Aziz bin Mohammed Al-Wasil; 1967 (age 58–59)
- Education: Marshall University (MA); Australian National University (PhD)
- Occupation: Diplomat

Abdulaziz Alwasil (Arabic: عبد العزيز الواصل; born 1967) is a Saudi Arabian diplomat and scholar who is the Permanent Representative of Saudi Arabia to the United Nations in New York. He was appointed in July 2022. He previously served as the Permanent Representative to the office in Geneva. He joined the diplomatic service in 1999.

Alwasil has served as Chairman of the Advisory Board of the UN Counter-Terrorism Centre since 2022. In 2024, he was elected Chair of the 69th Session of the Commission on the Status of Women. He also serves as Vice-President of the UN General Assembly at its 80th session and as President of the Executive Board of the International Association of Permanent Representatives.

== Early life and education ==
Alwasil holds a PhD in International Relations, a Master's degree in Political Science, and a Bachelor's degree in Arabic language and literature. Before joining the diplomatic service, he worked as a college lecturer.

== Diplomatic career ==
Alwasil has focused primarily on multilateral affairs and human rights law. During his diplomatic career, he served at the Saudi Embassy in Australia, the Permanent Mission of Saudi Arabia to the United Nations Office at Geneva, and the Saudi Embassy in London, where he was Deputy Head of Mission for more than three years.

In July 2022, he assumed the role of Ambassador and Permanent Representative of Saudi Arabia to the United Nations in New York. He has headed Saudi Arabia's delegation in several high-level meetings and conferences on international issues.
