= Stan Smith (footballer, born 1884) =

English footballer (1884–1956)

Personal information
- Full name: Stanley Smith
- Date of birth: 22 September 1884
- Place of birth: Southampton, England
- Date of death: 31 March 1956 (aged 71)
- Place of death: Shawford, Hampshire, England
- Height: 5 ft 5 in (1.65 m)
- Position: Outside right

Youth career
- Southampton Cambridge
- Ryde
- Bitterne Guild

Senior career*
| Years | Team | Apps | (Gls) |
| 1908–1911 | Southampton | 9 | (0) |
- * Club domestic league appearances and goals

Stanley Smith (22 September 1884 – 31 March 1956) was an English footballer who played at outside-right for Southampton in the Southern League between 1908 and 1911.

== Football career ==
Smith was born in Southampton and played football for various local sides leading to representative honours for the Hampshire F.A. In 1908, he joined Southampton for whom he gained a reputation for "accurately crossing the ball from awkward and seemingly impossible positions". He made his first-team debut when he took the place of John Bainbridge on the right wing for the Christmas Day 1908 match at West Ham United, which ended in a 1–0 defeat. Smith retained his place for the next two matches before Bainbridge's return.

He spent the next two years in the reserves before he was recalled on New Year's Eve 1910, when he had a run of six matches as the forward line was shuffled around in the absence of Harry Brown.

== Later career ==
Smith abandoned his football career in 1911 and joined the 18th (Queen Mary's Own) Hussars, with whom he served during World War I.
