= Audra Plepytė =

Lithuanian diplomat

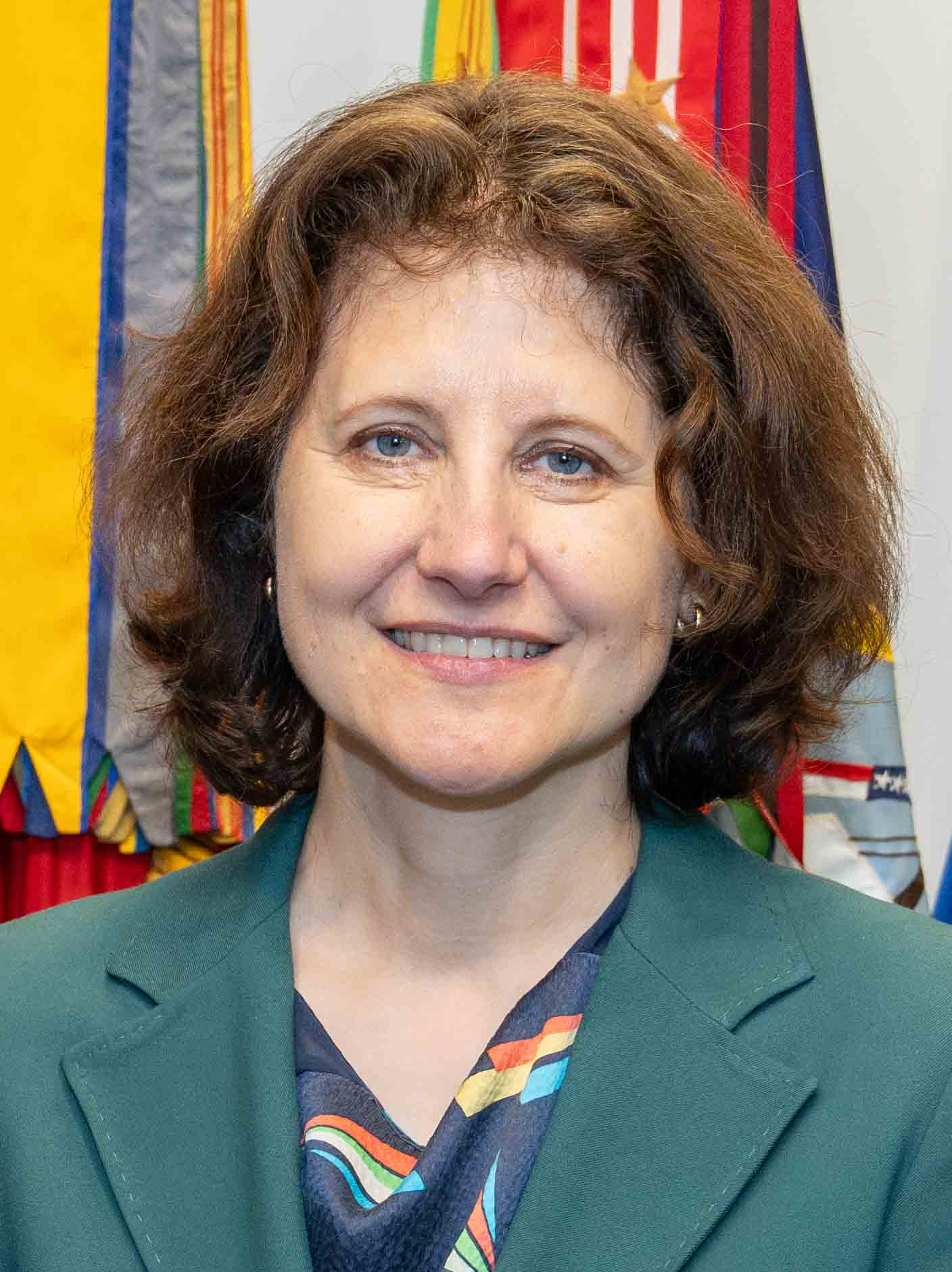
Audra Plepyte, Ambassador of Lithuania to the United States in 2025

Audra Plepytė (born 30 October 1971 in Vilnius) is a Lithuanian career diplomat and ambassador. From May 2021 to July 2025, she served as Lithuanian Ambassador to the United States and Mexico. From 2017, she was the Permanent Representative of Lithuania to the United Nations, where she was elected as the vice-president of the UNICEF Executive Board Bureau on January 12, 2021. Plepytė was the Lithuanian ambassador to Spain and UNWTO from 2010 to 2014.

== Biography ==
Born in Vilnius, Plepytė graduated from the Vilnius University with a bachelor's degree in philosophy in 1993, receiving a master's degree in philosophy in 1995. She also holds diplomas in international relations from the Institute of International Relations and Political Science at the Vilnius University (1992–1994) and in diplomatic studies from the Oxford University (1995-1996).

== Diplomatic career ==
Plepytė started her diplomatic career in 1994 as Second, Third Secretary at Multilateral Relations Division at the Ministry of Foreign Affairs. From 1996 to 1997 she served as First Secretary, Acting Head of Division of the Americas at the Ministry of Foreign Affairs. Ms Plepytė held different positions as Advisor to the CBSS Commissioner at the Council of the Baltic Sea States (1997-1998), Acting Head of Northern European Division at the Ministry of Foreign Affairs (1998-1999), Counselor at the Embassy of Lithuania in Washington, D.C. (02/1999-07/1999), Counselor, Deputy Permanent Representative to the United Nations at the Permanent Mission of Lithuania to the United Nations (1992-2002).

In 2003 Plepytė become Head of Human Rights and NGOs Division at the Ministry of Foreign Affairs. From 2004 to 2008 she was appointed as Counselor, Deputy Representative to the Political and Security Committee at the Lithuanian Permanent Representation to the EU. In 2008 she became Head of International Missions and Conflict Prevention Division at the Ministry of Foreign Affairs and Director of the Personnel Department at the Ministry of Foreign Affairs in 2009.

From 2010 to 2014 Plepytė was Lithuanian ambassador to Spain, World Tourism Organization in the Lithuanian Embassy to the Spain. She had been the director of the European Union Department at the Ministry of Foreign Affairs (2014–2017) before being appointed Permanent Representative of Lithuania to the United Nations in New York in August 2017. Ms Plepytė was elected as the president of the executive board of the United Nations Children's Fund (UNICEF) in January 2021. On 21 April 2021 she was nominated as Lithuanian ambassador to the United States. From May 2021 Lithuanian Ambassador to the United States of America and to the United Mexican States.

== Honours and awards ==
In 1998, she was awarded the decoration of The Royal Norwegian Order of Merit, Knight.

In 2003, she was awarded the decoration of the Order for Merits to Lithuania, Knight.

In 2015, she was awarded the decoration of the Order of Isabella the Catholic.

She is an active member of the International Gender Champions Network aimed at promoting gender parity and women's empowerment.
