= Michel Tommo Monthé =

Cameroonian diplomat

H.E. Michel Tommo Monthe

Permanent Representative to the UN for Cameroon
- Incumbent
- Assumed office 8 September 2008
- Preceded by: Martin Belinga Eboutou

Personal details
- Born: 26 March 1947 (age 79) Bana, Cameroon

Michel Tommo Monthe (born 26 March 1947) is a Cameroonian diplomat who has been Cameroon's Permanent Representative to the United Nations since 8 September 2008.

== Education and personal life ==
Born in Bana in Cameroon, Monthe obtained bachelor of arts and masters of arts degrees at the University of Yaoundé, Cameroon. He also has a doctorate in international relations from the International Relations Institute of Cameroon, University of Yaoundé II.

Monthe is married and has six children.

== Career ==
Monthe was the Vice Chairman of the Advisory Committee on Administrative and Budgetary Questions (ACABQ) before taking office at the United Nations. His other diplomatic postings included Special Adviser to the President of the fifty-ninth session of the General Assembly; Inspector General in Cameroon's Ministry of External Relations; Chair of the Anti-Corruption Unit in the Ministry; Ministry Secretary-General; Chargé de Mission in the Diplomatic Division of the General Secretariat at the Presidency; Technical Adviser in the Ministry of External Relations; and responsibility for consular affairs in the Protocol Department.

From 1977 to 1989, he served a prior term in New York. This term included postings as Second Secretary, First Secretary, Second Counselor and First Counselor for Cameroon's Permanent Mission to the United Nations.

== See also ==
- List of current permanent representatives to the United Nations
