= Jelena V. Pia-Comella =

Andorran diplomat

Jelena Pia-Comella is the Managing Coordinator for Global Action Against Mass Atrocities (GAAMAC). She was Deputy Permanent Representative of Andorra to the United Nations in 2002 and chargé d’affaires a.i./Chief of Mission to the United States and Canada from 2001 to 2007. She was succeeded by Carles Font-Rossell.

In 2024, Comella was elected in a vote at the United Nations (UN) in New York to serve on the United Nations Committee on the Elimination of Discrimination against Women (CEDAW) based in Geneva, Switzerland.
