= Stan Oduma Smith =

Bahamian diplomat

Ambassador Stan Oduma Smith

Permanent Representative of the Bahamas to UN
- In office March 2022 – present
- Preceded by: Elliston Rahming

Former Ambassador-at-Large in the Ministry of Foreign Affairs
- In office 2015–2017

Personal details
- Born: The Bahamas
- Education: Saint Mary's University; University of the West Indies
- Occupation: Diplomat; Lawyer

Stan Oduma Smith is a Bahamian diplomat and lawyer. He serves as the Permanent Representative of the Commonwealth of the Bahamas to the United Nations since March 2022. Prior to this role, he held various diplomatic and legal positions, including Ambassador-at-Large and head of the Legal Division in the Bahamas Ministry of Foreign Affairs.

== Early life and education ==
Smith was born in the Bahamas, where he completed his early education. He pursued higher education at Saint Mary's University in Canada, earning a bachelor’s degree. He later attended the University of the West Indies Law School, graduating as a qualified lawyer.

== Career ==
Smith began his professional journey as a lawyer, practicing in Barbados from 2005 to 2015. Between 2015 and 2017, he served as Ambassador-at-Large and headed the Legal Division in the Ministry of Foreign Affairs. In this role, he contributed to United Nations teams focusing on human rights and other critical issues.

From 2018 to 2021, Smith worked as a personal assistant to Prime Minister Perry Gladstone Christie, providing strategic support and facilitating diplomatic engagements. In March 2022, Smith was appointed as the Permanent Representative of the Bahamas to the United Nations succeeding Elliston Rahming.

Smith has also highlighted The Bahamas’ fiscal improvements in international forums. In August 2024, he credited the India-UN Development Partnership Fund for strengthening the country’s public debt management framework, noting a significant decrease in the debt-to-GDP ratio.
