= Elisenda Vives Balmaña =

Andorran diplomat

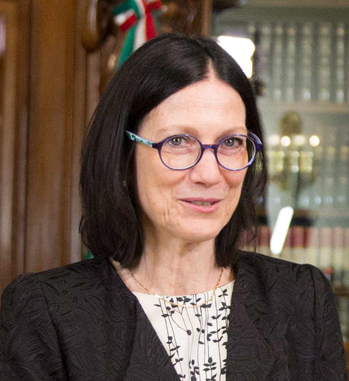
Elisenda Vives in 2017

Elisenda Vives Balmaña is an Andorran diplomat who served as the country's Permanent Representative to the United Nations since November 2015 until 2024. She was also Andorra's ambassador to the United States, Canada and Mexico, and to Morocco and Italy.

== Early life and education ==
Vives was born in Barcelona, Spain. Vives has a degree in philosophy and letters from the Autonomous University of Barcelona, a master's degrees in gender studies from the University of Barcelona, a master's degree in Eastern Asian studies and a postgraduate degree in comparative politics from the Open University of Catalonia, a postgraduate degree in Andorran law from the Universitat d'Andorra and a doctorate in history from the Autonomous University of Barcelona.

== Career ==
Vives was a professor of geography and history before working for the principality's Ministry of Foreign Affairs from 1992 until 2001. She was ambassador of Andorra to Italy and Morocco from 2000 until 2001.

Vives was Head of Protocol and Administrative Affairs of the General Council from 2001 until 2015. She was President of the Andorran National Commission for UNESCO from 2012 until 2015.

Vives was appointed Andorra's Permanent Representative to the UN by Prime Minister Antoni Martí on 3 November 2015. On 2 March 2016 she was also appointed as Andorra's ambassador to the United States, Canada and Mexico. She left the office in 2024, when was appointed to the Baltic states.

On 30 November 2016, Vives and her Sri Lankan counterpart A. Rohan Perera signed a joint communique establishing diplomatic relations between the two countries.

== Personal life ==
Vives is married and speaks four languages - Catalan, Spanish, French and English.
