= Stanley Wyatt Smith =

Stanley Wyatt-Smith
- Born: 3 April 1887; Minchinhampton, Gloucestershire, England
- Died: 17 November 1958 (aged 71); Burleigh, Stroud, Gloucestershire, England
- Education: Bedford Modern School
- Alma mater: King's College London
- Occupation: British Diplomat
- Known for: Consul-General of Manila; Consul-General of Honolulu

Stanley Wyatt-Smith (3 April 1887 – 17 November 1958) was a British diplomat. He was Consul-General of Manila (1938–42) and Honolulu (1943–44). A collection of his photographs taken in Wuhan during the 1911 Xinhai Revolution form part of the 'Historical Photographs of China' project and are held at the University of Bristol.

== Early life ==
Wyatt-Smith was born in Minchinhampton on 3 April 1887 the son of Rev. WH Smith and Susannah (née Rice). He was educated at Bedford Modern School and King's College London.

== Diplomatic service ==
In 1907 Wyatt-Smith entered the Consular Service in China. He was a student interpreter in Beijing (1907–09), and later witnessed the 1911 (Xinhai) Revolution; his photographs of the aftermath of that revolution form part of the 'Historical Photographs of China' project and are held at the University of Bristol. He was later student interpreter in Shanghai (1913–14) and Shantou (1914–17), before being made acting Consul at Jinan (1917–18) and later at Wuzhou (1918–20).

Wyatt-Smith was Vice-Consul at Hankou (1921), Shanghai (1922–23), Senior District Officer at Weihaiwei (1923–25), Consul at Zhenjiang (1926–27) and Tengyue (1927–31). The American journalist Edgar Snow stayed with Wyatt-Smith in Tengyue as relayed in Robert Farnsworth's book about Snow's time in Asia: 'Stanley Wyatt-Smith, the British consul, was a congenial and well-informed host'. Lady Diana Cooper described him as,'...delightful...His confidence and poise far exceeded any English Consuls I have seen'.

After Tengyue, Wyatt-Smith was Consul at Changsha (1931–32), Niuzhuang (1933), Jinan (1933), Fuzhou (1934–36) and Shantou (1937–38). In 1938 Smith was promoted to Consul-General of Manila (1938–42) until he was interned at Santo Tomas Internment Camp by the Japanese military authorities on the occupation of Manila and repatriated in 1942. In 1943 he was made Consul-General of Honolulu until his retirement in 1945.

== Family life ==
Wyatt-Smith married firstly Clara Mabel Smyth (one son and one daughter, his son killed on active service in 1945). He married secondly Beatrix, eldest daughter of Sir Francis Metford KCB OBE. He died in Burleigh, Stroud, Gloucestershire, on 17 November 1958.
