= Cherinet Hariffo =

Ethiopian diplomat

Cherinet Hariffo is an Ethiopian diplomat who serves as the Permanent Representative of the Intergovernmental Authority on Development (IGAD) to the United Nations. A former refugee, Hariffo became the youngest individual in history to be appointed to such a position when he presented his credentials in March 2025.
