= Permanent Representative of Lithuania to the United Nations =

Permanent Representative of the Republic of Lithuania
- Flag of the United Nations
- Incumbent; Rytis Paulauskas since 18 May 2021
- Inaugural holder: Anicetas Simutis
- Formation: 1991
- Website: Permanent Mission site

This is a list of the Permanent Representatives of the Republic of Lithuania to the United Nations. The current office holder since 2021 is Rytis Paulauskas.

== List ==
No.	Permanent Representative	Years served	United Nations Secretary-General
1	Anicetas Simutis	1991	Javier Pérez de Cuéllar
1	Anicetas Simutis	1991–1994	Boutros Boutros-Ghali
2	Oskaras Jusys	1994–1997	Boutros Boutros-Ghali
2	Oskaras Jusys	1997–2000	Kofi Annan
3	Gediminas Šerkšnys	2000–2006	Kofi Annan
4	Dalius Čekuolis	2006–2007	Kofi Annan
4	Dalius Čekuolis	2007–2012	Ban Ki-moon
5	Raimonda Murmokaitė	2012–2016	Ban Ki-moon
5	Raimonda Murmokaitė	2017	António Guterres
6	Audra Plepytė	2017–2021	António Guterres
7	Rytis Paulauskas	2021–present	António Guterres

== See also ==
- Foreign relations of Lithuania
