= Jukka Salovaara =

Finnish diplomat

Jukka Salovaara (born 1968 Helsinki) is a Finnish diplomat. Since May 2022, he has served as state secretary to the Ministry for Foreign Affairs of Finland. Salovaara served as Finland's permanent representative and head of mission in the United Nations in 2019–2022.

In 2015–2019, Salovaara was the head of the political department of the Ministry for Foreign Affairs. Previously, he has served, among other things, as the head of the European Department of the Ministry for Foreign Affairs, deputy head of the Government's EU Secretariat and committee counsellor of the Parliamentary Committee on Foreign Affairs.

In June 2026, Salovaara was appointed EU ambassador to the United Kingdom. Salovaara will start in the position in early September.

Salovaara graduated with a master's degree in political science from the University of Helsinki in 1992 and completed the Ministry for Foreign Affairs' international affairs preparatory course in 1995.
