= Isabelle Picco =

Monegasque diplomat, peace activist and lawyer

Isabelle F. Picco (born 1962) is a Monegasque diplomat, peace activist and lawyer. Since September 2009, she has been the permanent representative of Monaco at the United Nations.

== Early life and education ==
Born on 8 November, 1962 in Monaco, Isabelle Picco studied environmental law at the University of Paris I, graduating in 1987. She went on to study international law, earning a master research degree from the University of Paris II in 1988 and a master of law in energy production and distribution from Paris I the following year.

Fluent in French, English, Italian and Spanish, Picco is married and has one child.

== Career ==
From 1990, Picco served as an official of Monaco's Ministry of Economy, Finance and Budget where she was responsible for legal matters. In 1993, when Monaco become a member of the United Nations, Picco joined Monaco's UN Mission. In 1999, she was appointed Deputy Permanent Representative.

In June 2010, for the 65th session of the General Assembly, Picco was appointed chair of the Sixth Committee which deals with international law. In 2012, she chaired the 22nd meeting of the United Nations Convention on the Law of the Sea and was elected vice president of the UN General Assembly for the 68th session (2013–2014). She is co-chair of the UN Group of Friends of Sport for Development and Peace and is a member of the Group of Friends of Oceans and Seas. She also contributes to the Parity Group at the UN Secretariat and to that on the prevention of drowning.

== Awards and distinctions ==
In 2005, Prince Albert of Monaco honoured Isabelle Picco with the insignia of Knight of the Order of Saint-Charles.
