= Laura Dupuy Lasserre =

Uruguayan diplomat (born 1967)

Laura Dupuy
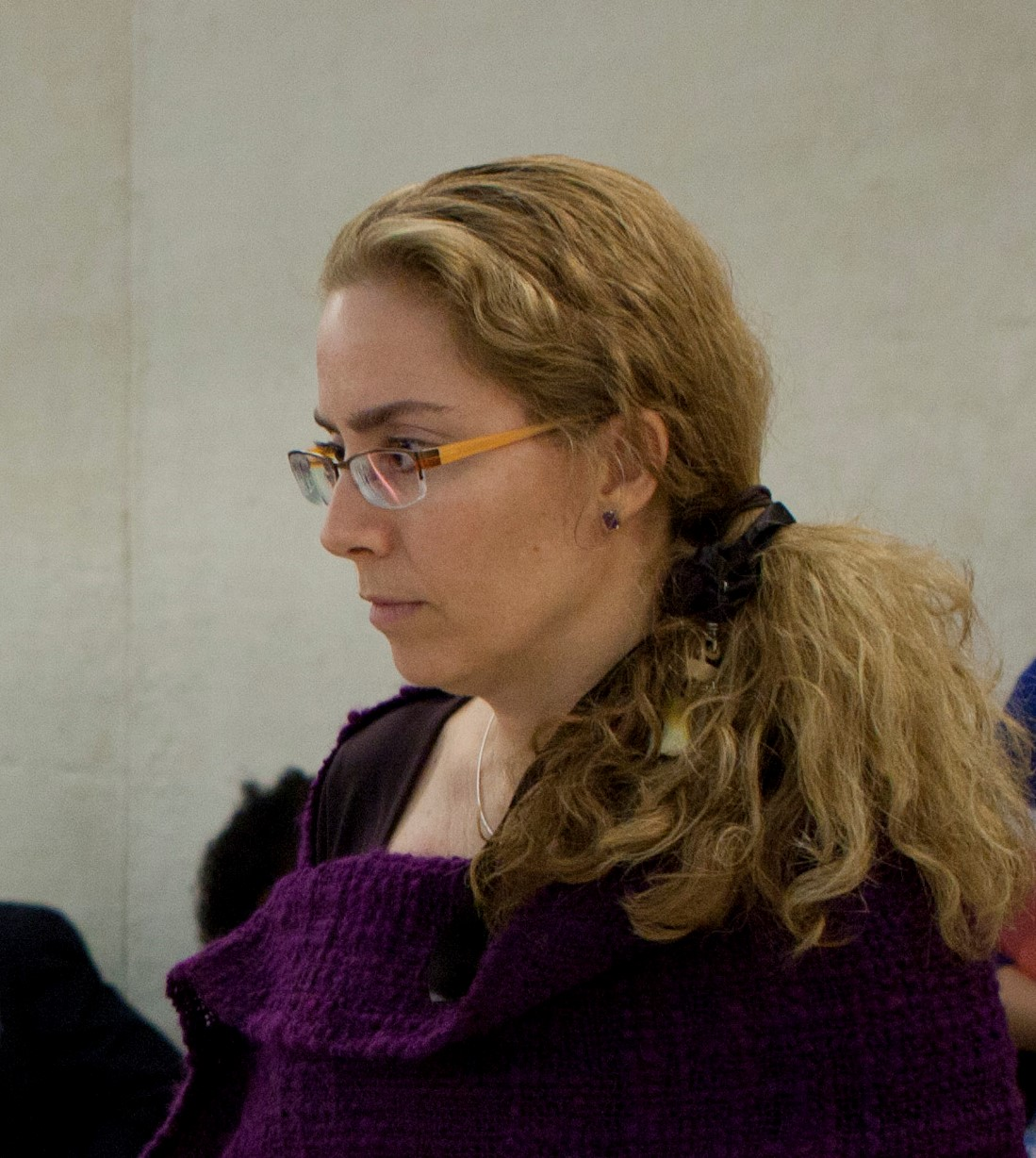
- Born: Laura Dupuy Lasserre; 18 September 1967 (age 59); Montevideo, Uruguay
- Education: University of the Republic
- Occupation: diplomat
- Known for: Permanent Representative of Uruguay to the United Nations

Laura Dupuy Lasserre (born 18 September 1967) is a Uruguayan diplomat, and beginning in 2009, was the Permanent Representative of Uruguay to the United Nations Office at Geneva with the rank of Ambassador. She was elected President of the United Nations Human Rights Council in 2011, and is recognized as the longest-serving President in the history of the UNHRC.

== Life ==
Lasserre was born in Montevideo in 1967. She graduated in 1990 in International Relations at the University of the Republic of Uruguay.

She was elected President of the United Nations Human Rights Council for the term 2011–2012 and holds the distinction of being its longest-serving President to date.

Dupuy served as Director of Human Rights and Humanitarian Law at the Ministry of Foreign Affairs of Uruguay, as Director for the Americas, responsible for bilateral relations with the 34 countries in the region, and as President-Rapporteur of the Social Forum 2010 on Climate Change and Human Rights.
