= Foreign relations of Tuvalu =

From 1916 to 1975, Tuvalu was part of the Gilbert and Ellice Islands colony of the United Kingdom. A referendum was held in 1974 to determine whether the Gilbert Islands and Ellice Islands should each have their own administration. As a consequence of the referendum, the separate British colonies of Kiribati and Tuvalu were formed. Tuvalu became fully independent as a sovereign state within the Commonwealth on 1 October 1978. On 5 September 2000, Tuvalu became the 189th member of the United Nations.

Tuvalu is a very small island country of 26 km^{2} (10 mi^{2}). In terms of physical land size, Tuvalu is the fourth smallest country in the world, larger only than the Vatican City—0.44 km^{2}; Monaco—1.95 km^{2} and Nauru—21 km^{2}. it is the second-least populated independent country in the world, with a population of 10,507 (2017 Census). Because of the small size of the economy of Tuvalu, its foreign relations are limited to its most important partners. Tuvalu maintains close relations with Fiji, New Zealand, Australia (which has maintained a High Commission in Tuvalu since 2018), Japan, South Korea, Taiwan, the United States of America, the United Kingdom and the European Union.

As a small Pacific Island nation, a major concern is the effect of climate change on the atolls. Tuvalu is a developing country and works with other island states, which tend to share similar sustainable development challenges, such as the Pacific Small Island Developing States (PSIDS).

Tuvalu participates in the work of the Pacific Community (SPC) and is a member of the Pacific Islands Forum, the Commonwealth of Nations and the United Nations. It has maintained a mission at the United Nations in New York City since 2000.

== International organisational participation ==
=== Tuvalu and the Commonwealth of Nations ===
On 1 September 2000, Tuvalu became a full member of the Commonwealth of Nations. Since its independence in 1978, Tuvalu had been a special member, but without having any voting rights in the organisation that brings together 54 countries that are mostly former colonies of the United Kingdom. Tuvalu's admission as a full member was approved by the members of the Commonwealth unanimously earlier in the year.

=== Membership of the United Nations ===
Tuvalu became the 189th member of the United Nations on 17 September 2000.

Ambassador Tapugao Falefou took up his appointment as the permanent representative of Tuvalu to the United Nations on 13 February 2023. He was also appointed as the Ambassador to the United States of America.

Tuvalu notably played an active role in the 2009 United Nations Climate Change Conference in Copenhagen, attracting media and public attention with a proposed protocol which would have imposed deeper, legally binding emission cuts, including on developing nations. Following Tuvaluan delegate Ian Fry's "tear-jerking [speech] that prompted wild applause among the crowded Copenhagen conference floor", The Australian's political editor commented that Tuvalu was "no longer small fry on the world stage".

The United Nations designates Tuvalu as a least developed country (LDC) because of its limited potential for economic development, absence of exploitable resources and its small size and vulnerability to external economic and environmental shocks. Tuvalu participates in the Enhanced Integrated Framework for Trade-Related Technical Assistance to Least Developed Countries (EIF), which was established in October 1997 under the auspices of the World Trade Organisation. In 2013 Tuvalu deferred its graduation from least developed country (LDC) status to a Developing country to 2015. Prime Minister Enele Sopoaga said that this deferral was necessary to maintain access by Tuvalu to the funds provided by the United Nations's National Adaptation Programme of Action (NAPA), as "Once Tuvalu graduates to a developed country, it will not be considered for funding assistance for climate change adaptation programmes like NAPA, which only goes to LDCs". Tuvalu had met targets so that Tuvalu was to graduate from LDC status. Prime minister, Enele Sopoaga wants the United Nations to reconsider its criteria for graduation from LDC status as not enough weight is given to the environmental plight of small island states like Tuvalu in the application of the Environmental Vulnerability Index (EVI).

=== Regional organisational relations ===
Tuvalu is a full member of the Pacific Islands Forum, the South Pacific Applied Geoscience Commission, the South Pacific Tourism Organisation, the Secretariat of the Pacific Regional Environment Programme and the Pacific Community.

Tuvalu participates in the operations of the Pacific Islands Forum Fisheries Agency (FFA) and the Western and Central Pacific Fisheries Commission (WCPFC). The Tuvaluan government, the US government, and the governments of other Pacific islands, are parties to the South Pacific Tuna Treaty (SPTT), entered into force in 1988. The current SPTT agreement expires on 14 June 2013. Tuvalu is one of the eight signatories of the Nauru Agreement Concerning Cooperation in the Management of Fisheries of Common Interest (Nauru Agreement) which collectively controls 25–30% of the world's tuna supply and approximately 60% of the western and central Pacific tuna supply . In May 2013 representatives from the United States and the Pacific Islands countries agreed to sign interim arrangement documents to extend the Multilateral Fisheries Treaty (which encompasses the South Pacific Tuna Treaty and Nauru Agreement) to confirm access to the fisheries in the Western and Central Pacific for US tuna boats for 18 months.

In 1993, Tuvalu became a member of the Asian Development Bank. Tuvalu endorsed the Treaty of Rarotonga joining itself to the South Pacific Nuclear Free Zone Treaty in 1985.

In 2004, Tuvalu provided police officers to the Regional Assistance Mission to Solomon Islands (RAMSI). Tuvaluan Police officers served as part of RAMSI's Participating Police Force (PPF).

In November 2011, Tuvalu was one of the eight founding members of Polynesian Leaders Group, a regional grouping intended to cooperate on a variety of issues including culture and language, education, responses to climate change, and trade and investment. Tuvalu participates in the Alliance of Small Island States (AOSIS), which is a coalition of small island and low-lying coastal countries that have concerns about their vulnerability to the adverse effects of global climate change. Under the Majuro Declaration, which was signed on 5 September 2013, Tuvalu committed to implement power generation of 100% renewable energy, which was proposed to be implemented using Solar PV (95% of demand) and biodiesel (5% of demand). The feasibility of wind power generation will be considered as part of the commitment to increase the use of renewable energy in Tuvalu.

On 18 February 2016 Tuvalu signed the Pacific Islands Development Forum Charter and formally joined the Pacific Islands Development Forum (PIDF). In June 2017, Tuvalu signed the Pacific Agreement on Closer Economic Relations (PACER).

=== International organisations ===
In addition to its membership in the UN and the Commonwealth of Nations, outside the region, Tuvalu is a member or participant of the ACP (Lomé Convention), the Alliance of Small Island States, Asian Development Bank, Economic and Social Commission for Asia and the Pacific (ESCAP), the Food and Agriculture Organization (FAO), the G-77, the International Bank for Reconstruction and Development, the International Civil Aviation Organization, the International Development Association, the International Finance Corporation, the IMF, the International Maritime Organization, the International Olympic Committee, the ITU and the Universal Postal Union. While Tuvalu is not currently a member of the International Red Cross and Red Crescent Movement, it has observer status with admission and recognition still pending.

In July 2013 Tuvalu signed the Memorandum of Understanding (MOU) to establish the Pacific Regional Trade and Development Facility, which Facility originated in 2006, in the context of negotiations for an Economic Partnership Agreement (EPA) between Pacific ACP States and the European Union. The rationale for the creation of the Facility being to improve the delivery of aid to Pacific island countries in support of the Aid-for-Trade (AfT) requirements. The Pacific ACP States are the countries in the Pacific that are signatories to the Cotonou Agreement with the European Union (which succeeded the Lomé Convention). On 31 May 2017 the first enhanced High Level Political Dialogue between Tuvalu and the European Union under the Cotonou Agreement was held in Funafuti.

Tuvalu is also a member of the following organisations:

ACP, ADB, AOSIS, Commonwealth of Nations, FAO, IBRD (also known as the World Bank), ICAO, IDA, IFRCS (observer), ILO, IMF, IMO, IOC, ITU, OPCW, PIF, Sparteca, SPC, UN, UNCTAD, UNESCO, UPU, WHO, World Meteorological Organization.

Tuvalu became a member of the Asian Development Bank in 1993, and became a member of the World Bank in 2010.

Tuvalu is notable for its absence of membership in several major international organisations. For example, it is one of only four UN members that do not belong to the Specialized Agencies. Tuvalu is one of only 13 UN members that are not members of the International Finance Corporation and is one of only 16 UN members that are neither a member nor an observer of the World Trade Organization. Finally, as with many other nations in Oceania, Tuvalu is not a member of Interpol or of the International Hydrographic Organization.

== Relations with other nations ==
=== Consulates and honorary consulates ===
Tuvalu has only five diplomatic missions abroad: a High Commission in Suva, Fiji, (opened in 1976), its office at the United Nations (opened in 2001), an embassy in the Republic of China (opened in March 2013), a High Commission in Wellington, New Zealand (opened in February 2015). and an embassy to the United Arab Emirates in Abu Dhabi (opened in April 2022).

Tuvalu maintains honorary consulates in Australia, Germany, Japan, New Zealand, the Philippines, Singapore, South Korea, Switzerland, the United States, Gambia, and the United Kingdom.

The Republic of China (Taiwan) has a resident embassy in Tuvalu. France maintains an honorary consulate in Tuvalu. In 2018 Australia upgraded its representation in Tuvalu from a representative office of AusAid to a High Commission. All three of these are located in Funafuti. In 2021 Tuvalu appointed Ambassador Shivshankar Nair GCEG as its Envoy to The Commonwealth to lead the campaign of Sir Italeli Iakoba, the former Governor General to become the SG of the Commonwealth. Subsequently, Ambassador Nair was appointed Special Envoy in charge of Oceans and Climate change

== Diplomatic relations ==
List of countries which Tuvalu maintains diplomatic relations with:

#	Country	Date
1	Nauru	Unknown
2	Australia	30 November 1977
3	Canada	1 October 1978
4	Fiji	1 October 1978
5	New Zealand	1 October 1978
6	United Kingdom	October 1978
7	South Korea	15 November 1978
8	Kiribati	1978
9	Japan	30 April 1979
10	United States	10 May 1979
11	France	14 May 1979
12	Germany	26 June 1979
13	Turkey	19 July 1979
14	Italy	July 1979
—	Republic of China	19 September 1979
15	Papua New Guinea	January 1980
16	Chile	30 July 1980
17	Solomon Islands	1 October 1980
18	Belgium	Before 1981
19	Netherlands	February 1982
20	Malaysia	5 April 1983
21	Bangladesh	29 August 1983
22	Israel	July 1984
23	Greece	1984
24	India	13 August 1986
25	Federated States of Micronesia	3 March 1988
26	Samoa	1988
27	Marshall Islands	14 September 1990
28	Spain	4 May 1995
29	Ireland	September 2000
30	Singapore	8 December 2001
31	Philippines	23 September 2002
32	Iceland	26 July 2005
33	Czech Republic	28 July 2005
34	Thailand	29 August 2005
35	Switzerland	4 November 2005
36	Malta	20 January 2006
37	Slovakia	30 January 2006
38	Maldives	14 March 2006
39	Austria	23 March 2006
40	Cuba	26 April 2006
41	Brazil	12 May 2006
42	Romania	12 May 2006
43	Mexico	27 September 2006
44	Iran	2008
45	Finland	6 March 2009
46	Portugal	26 May 2009
47	Azerbaijan	9 September 2009
48	Luxembourg	16 September 2009
49	Slovenia	23 September 2009
50	United Arab Emirates	29 March 2010
51	Norway	7 May 2010
52	Seychelles	20 December 2010
53	Egypt	23 December 2010
54	Georgia	4 February 2011
55	Montenegro	4 May 2011
56	Bulgaria	18 May 2011
57	Guatemala	20 May 2011
58	Morocco	23 May 2011
59	Estonia	25 May 2011
60	Albania	1 June 2011
61	Bosnia and Herzegovina	1 June 2011
62	Paraguay	2 June 2011
63	Hungary	3 June 2011
64	Cambodia	28 June 2011
65	North Macedonia	29 June 2011
66	Latvia	7 July 2011
67	Nicaragua	3 August 2011
68	Tajikistan	1 September 2011
69	Uruguay	9 September 2011
70	Kyrgyzstan	14 September 2011
71	Ecuador	19 September 2011
72	Russia	25 October 2011
73	Mongolia	5 December 2011
74	Armenia	16 March 2012
75	Qatar	9 March 2012
76	Peru	29 March 2012
77	Colombia	3 April 2012
78	Comoros	5 April 2012
79	Republic of Congo	27 April 2012
80	Moldova	8 May 2012
81	Monaco	29 May 2012
82	Liechtenstein	1 June 2012
83	Algeria	6 June 2012
84	El Salvador	8 June 2012
85	Dominican Republic	13 June 2012
86	Mauritania	13 June 2012
87	Dominica	26 July 2012
88	Gambia	26 July 2012
89	Kazakhstan	27 July 2012
90	Sweden	24 August 2012
91	Liberia	28 August 2012
92	Timor-Leste	8 September 2012
93	Belarus	12 September 2012
94	Saint Vincent and the Grenadines	19 September 2012
95	Ukraine	27 September 2012
96	Guyana	28 September 2012
97	Indonesia	1 October 2012
98	Haiti	7 November 2012
99	Andorra	9 November 2012
100	Kuwait	29 November 2012
101	Nepal	11 December 2012
102	Burkina Faso	15 February 2013
103	San Marino	19 March 2013
104	Senegal	1 July 2013
105	Cyprus	2 July 2013
—	Cook Islands	August 2013
106	Saudi Arabia	26 March 2015
107	Poland	4 May 2015
—	Kosovo	2016
108	Argentina	15 May 2018
109	Lithuania	7 June 2018
110	Serbia	4 April 2019
111	Croatia	2 November 2020
112	Venezuela	4 August 2021
113	Saint Kitts and Nevis	4 April 2022
114	Bahamas	23 June 2022
115	Gabon	24 June 2022
—	Niue	11 July 2022
116	Vanuatu	12 July 2022
117	Palau	15 July 2022
118	Saint Lucia	14 December 2022
119	Vietnam	24 September 2025
120	Lebanon	Unknown
121	Mauritius	Unknown
122	Pakistan	Unknown
123	Tonga	Unknown
124	Trinidad and Tobago	Unknown

== Bilateral relations ==
=== Americas ===
Country	Formal relations began on	Notes
Cuba	26 April 2006	See Cuba–Tuvalu relations In September 2008, Prime Minister Apisai Ielemia attended the first Cuba-Pacific Islands ministerial meeting in Havana. He was, along with I-Kiribati President Anote Tong, one of the first two Pacific leaders to visit Cuba. The meeting aimed at "strengthening cooperation" between Cuba and Pacific Island countries, notably in coping with the effects of climate change – an issue of critical importance to Tuvalu. At the meeting the Cuban Government agreed to provide qualified medical doctors to work in Tuvalu and to provide medical education to Tuvaluan students. In 2008 the Government of Tuvalu sent ten Tuvaluan students to study medicine in Cuba and ten more were sent in 2010. The first Cuban doctor arrived in Tuvalu in October 2008 with two additional doctors arriving in February 2009. In 2011 there were four Cuban doctors working at the Princess Margaret Hospital.
Mexico	27 September 2006	Mexico and Tuvalu established diplomatic relations on 27 September 2006. Mexico is accredited to Tuvalu from its embassy in Wellington, New Zealand. Tuvalu does not have an accreditation to Mexico.
United States	10 May 1979	See Tuvalu–United States relations Tuvalu-United States relations were confirmed with the signing of a Treaty of Friendship in 1979, which was ratified by the U.S. Senate in 1983, under which the United States renounced prior territorial claims to four Tuvaluan islands (Funafuti, Nukufetau, Nukulaelae and Niulakita). The U.S. claim originated from 1939, in which the U.S. State Department claimed various South Pacific islands then under British colonial administration. The basis for claiming the four Tuvaluan islands was their initial discovery by U.S. nationals and subsequent topographic surveying by the U.S. Navy. In 1981 the State Department acknowledged the claims were “extremely tenuous” and “not supported by any other nation.” The Tuvaluan government, the US government, and the governments of other Pacific islands, are parties to South Pacific Tuna Treaty (SPTT). That agreement entered into force in 1988. Tuvalu and the other members of the Pacific Islands Forum Fisheries Agency (FFA) and the United States have settled a tuna fishing deal for 2015; a longer-term deal will be negotiated. The treaty is an extension of the Nauru Agreement. The United States ambassador to Fiji oversees diplomatic relations with Tuvalu. While the relationship is generally positive, disagreements between the two countries over climate change have caused some strain.

=== Asia ===
Country	Formal relations began on	Notes
Georgia	31 March 2014	In 2011, the government of Prime Minister Willy Telavi recognised Abkhazia and South Ossetia, which had broken away from Georgia and which Georgia viewed as remaining part of its sovereign territory. However, the government of Prime Minister Enele Sopoaga retracted the recognition of Abkhazia and South Ossetia on 31 March 2014 when Tuvalu's Foreign Minister Taukelina Finikaso signed an agreement to establish diplomatic relations with Georgia. Tuvalu's Foreign Minister said that his country supports Georgia's territorial integrity in its international recognized borders. Taukelina Finikaso is also reported as saying that re-establishing diplomatic relations with Georgia was an important step towards strengthening ties with the European Union, which he described as a traditional friend of Tuvalu.
India	1986	See India–Tuvalu relations Diplomatic relations between the two countries received a boost when the High Commission of India in Suva, Fiji which had been closed in May 1990, was re-opened in March 1999. Bilateral relations intensified after the initiation of the Forum for India–Pacific Islands Cooperation (FIPIC) by the Narendra Modi government in 2014. A Tuvaluan delegation led by Governor-General Sir Iakoba Italeli attended the first FIPIC Summit hosted in Suva, Fiji on 19 November 2014 by Prime Minister Modi.
Indonesia	3 October 2012	Indonesia and Tuvalu established diplomatic relations on 3 October 2012. In 2019, Indonesia provided police training for Tuvalu Police Force from 22 to 24 July 2019.
Japan	30 April 1979	Manu Folau off Vaitupu Harbour Japan and Tuvalu established diplomatic relations in 1979. Japan is a significant aid provider in the form of grants and technical cooperation, including donating the 50-meter vessel, the Manu Folau. In 2015 the Nivaga III was donated by the government of Japan, which ship has capacity for 380 passengers and also freight. In 2011 Government of Japan provided three new desalination units and parts to repair the existing seawater desalination units through Japan International Cooperation Agency (JICA) following the severe water shortages caused by the 2011 Tuvalu drought. Japan had provided desalination units in 1999 and 2006. In response to the 2011 drought, Japan has funded the purchase of a solar-powered 100 m³/d desalination plant and two portable 10 m³/d plants as part of its Pacific Environment Community (PEC) program.
Kuwait	29 November 2012	Kuwait established diplomatic relations with Tuvalu on 29 November 2012. In May 2015 Kuwait donated US$200,000 (approx. AUD$260,000) in financial support for the recovery activities in respect to Cyclone Pam.
Kyrgyzstan	14 September 2011	Kyrgyzstan and Tuvalu established diplomatic relations on 14 September 2011.
South Korea	15 November 1978	See Tuvalu–South Korea relations Tuvalu maintains very strong relations with South Korea through the South Korean Embassy in Fiji. The government of South Korea funded the shipment of 60,000 bottles of water from Fiji to Tuvalu as a first response to the water shortage caused by the 2011 Tuvalu drought. Relations with North Korea is unknown.
Taiwan	19 September 1979	Tuvalu is one of the few nations that continue to have strong diplomatic relations with the Republic of China and supports ROC's bid to join the United Nations. In turn, the ROC maintains the only resident embassy in Tuvalu and has a large assistance program in the islands with "several mobile medical missions". Taiwan funded the construction of Tuvalu's largest building, a three-story administrative building. In 2019, Taiwan aid provided a contribution of $7.06 million to Tuvalu's budget. In 2006, Taiwan expressed concern over reports that the People's Republic of China (PRC) was attempting to draw Tuvalu away from the Republic of China. Taiwan consequently made efforts to further strengthen its diplomatic relations with Tuvalu. In 2019 Tuvalu Kausea Natano, the prime minister, reaffirmed Tuvalu's commitment to its relationship with Taiwan. On 14 March 2013, a Tuvaluan embassy was opened in Taipei.
Turkey	19 July 1979	Turkey and Tuvalu established diplomatic relations on 19 July 1979. Turkish ambassador in Wellington to New Zealand is also accredited to Tuvalu. Trade volume between the two countries was negligible in 2019.
United Arab Emirates	29 March 2010	The United Arab Emirates and Tuvalu established diplomatic relations on 29 March 2010. In April 2022, Tuvalu opened an embassy to the United Arab Emirates in Abu Dhabi.

=== Europe ===
Country	Formal relations began on	Notes
European Union		The European Union provides a significant amount of aid and technical assistance to Tuvalu; Aid programs for water supply and improvements to waste treatment and other environmental issues were announced in 2009. In March 2014 the European Union provided finance to the Government of Tuvalu for the supply and installation of battery-backed solar photovoltaic (PV) systems for the outer islands. The 191kWp project extends the implementation of renewable energy in Tuvalu and will provide the islands with 24 hours-a-day electricity. Tuvalu will be able to reduce consumption of fuel used to produce electricity by 120,000 litres of diesel per year, amounting to reduction in spending on diesel of about AU$200,000.
France		Through French Polynesia, France shares a sea border with Tuvalu, and Tuvalu maintains very strong relations with France, cooperating in France's environmental efforts and maintaining close ties with French positions in votes in the United Nations. The French Pacific Funds for Cultural, Social and Economic Development has funded projects in Tuvalu. The largest of these projects (at €50,000) was a major study on renewable energy in 2005. Other projects to date have included the construction of La Pérouse School (1992), air navigation training (1996), the electrification of the Amatuku Maritime School (1996) and a project to increase food production on Nanumaga (1998). The Franco-Tuvalan environmental protection non-governmental organisation Alofa Tuvalu has operated in Tuvalu since 2009, primarily with French funding. Alofa Tuvalu's stated purpose is to conduct an "extensive study and documentation project aimed at reinforcing Tuvalu's capacities to survey, monitor and manage its marine resources, along with increasing its local and scientific knowledge of them."
Germany	26 June 1979	Germany and Tuvalu established diplomatic relations on 26 June 1979. The German Embassy in Wellington, New Zealand, is responsible for Tuvalu. A Tuvaluan Government delegation, headed by the country's then Finance Minister Bikenibeu Paeniu, visited Germany in January 2005, the first such visit in many years. At the invitation of Federal Chancellor Merkel, Tuvalu's then Prime Minister Apisai Ielemia travelled to Berlin and Potsdam in late 2009 in the run-up to the Copenhagen Conference. In November 2017 Tuvalu's current Prime Minister Enele Sopoaga led a delegation to the United Nations Climate Change Conference (COP 23) in Bonn, where he also hosted a workshop.
Italy		Italy's diplomatic relations with Tuvalu are handled by the Italian embassy in Wellington, New Zealand.
Poland	4 May 2015	On 29 May 2015 a joint communique on the establishment of diplomatic relations was signed by HE Aunese Simati the Permanent Representative of Tuvalu to the United Nations and Permanent Representative of Poland to the UN, Mr Boguslaw Winid. Poland's diplomatic relations with Tuvalu are handled by the Polish Embassy in Wellington, New Zealand.
Spain	4 May 1995	Spain has maintained diplomatic relations with Tuvalu since May 4 of 1995. Bilateral relations both politically and commercially between the two countries are scarce, mainly framed within the framework of EU cooperation with Tuvalu through the programs of the Development Funds and the Economic Partnership Agreement. The country is under the jurisdiction of the Spanish Embassy in Canberra, and consular affairs are addressed from the Spanish Consulate General in Sydney.
Sweden	24 August 2012	Sweden's diplomatic relations with Tuvalu are handled by the Swedish Embassy in Canberra, Australia.
Switzerland	6 November 2005	Switzerland's diplomatic relations with Tuvalu are handled by the Swiss Embassy in Wellington, New Zealand.
United Kingdom	1 October 1978	See Tuvalu–United Kingdom relations Tuvalu established diplomatic relations with the United Kingdom on 1 October 1978.: Tuvalu maintains an honorary consulate in London.; The United Kingdom is not accredited to Tuvalu through a high commission; the UK develops relations through its high commission in Suva, Fiji.; The UK governed Tuvalu from 1892 until 1978, when Tuvalu achieved full independence. Both countries share common membership of the Commonwealth, the United Nations, and the World Health Organization. Bilaterally the two countries have a Double Taxation Arrangement.

=== Oceania ===
Country	Formal relations began on	Notes
Australia	1 October 1978	See Australia–Tuvalu relations Australia has strong ties with Tuvalu and was one of the three founding donating countries to the Tuvalu Trust Fund and continues as a major donor of aid and technical assistance to Tuvalu. The official currency of Tuvalu from 1966 to 1976 was the Australian dollar, which strengthens the economic bonds between the two countries in particular. Since 1976, Tuvalu began issuing its own coinage (see Tuvaluan dollar) but the country continues to use Australian banknotes as official currency, and the value of the Tuvaluan currency is directly tied to the Australian dollar. In this regard, the Tuvaluan dollar is similar to the Faroese króna's relationship to the Danish krone as the Tuvaluan dollar is not an independent currency but has been assigned an ISO 4217 currency code, although it is treated as equivalent to the Australian dollar. Tuvaluans can participate in the Australian Pacific Seasonal Worker Program, which allows Pacific Islanders to obtain seasonal employment in the Australian agriculture industry, in particular cotton and cane operations; fishing industry, in particular aquaculture; and with accommodation providers in the tourism industry. In the 2018 Federal budget, Australia allocated funding to establish a High Commission in Tuvalu, which was established in Tuvalu Road, Vaiaku, Funafuti. On 10 November 2023, Tuvalu signed the Falepili Union, a bilateral diplomatic relationship with Australia, under which Australia will increase its contribution to the Tuvalu Trust Fund and to the Tuvalu Coastal Adaptation Project (TCAP). Australia will also provide an pathway for citizens of Tuvalu to migrate to Australia, to enable climate-related mobility for Tuvaluans.
Fiji		See Fiji–Tuvalu relations Relations with Fiji are important as it is by far Tuvalu's largest source of imports. In 2010, Fiji was the source of 46.1% of all imports to Tuvalu. Additionally, relations with Fiji are of particular importance to Tuvalu as all regularly scheduled commercial flights to and from Tuvalu are through Fiji. At present, the only airline flying into the country is Fiji Airways (formerly known as Air Pacific). Additionally, regular commercial boat service to Tuvalu is primarily through Fiji. The majority of nations that recognize Tuvalu accredit their embassies in Fiji to serve Tuvalu. This makes Fiji an important diplomatic centre for Tuvalu. His Excellency The President Ratu Epeli Nailatikau of Fiji visited Tuvalu in February 2014. He described Tuvalu is being a valued partner in the Pacific Islands Development Forum (PIDF) and spoke of Fiji and Tuvalu as having a joint interest in working within the Pacific Small Island Developing States forum to push the rest of the world to take decisive action on climate change. In October 2014 the prime ministers of Fiji and Tuvalu signed the Fiji-Tuvalu Maritime Boundary Treaty, which establishes the extent of the national areas of jurisdiction between Fiji and Tuvalu as recognized in international law under the 1982 United Nations Convention on the Law of the Sea.
Kiribati		On 29 August 2012 an 'Agreement between Tuvalu and Kiribati concerning their Maritime Boundary', was signed by their respective leaders that determined the boundary as being seaward of Nanumea and Niutao in Tuvalu on the one hand and Tabiteuea, Tamana and Arorae in Kiribati on the other hand, along the geodesics connecting the points of latitude and longitude set out in the agreement.
New Zealand	1 October 1978	See New Zealand–Tuvalu relations New Zealand has strong ties with Tuvalu and was one of the three founding donating countries to the Tuvalu Trust Fund and continues as a major donor of aid and technical assistance to Tuvalu. The government of New Zealand responded to the fresh-water crisis caused by the 2011 Tuvalu drought by supplying temporary desalination plants and personnel to repair existing desalination plants. In 2015 a New Zealand aid programme will extend the implementation of renewable energy in Tuvalu. This project will result in the supply and installation of battery-backed solar photovoltaic (PV) systems that are to be located on Vaitupu, Nanumanga, Niutao and Nanumea, with the first hybrid system being built on Vaitupu in early 2015. New Zealand has an annual quota of 75 Tuvaluans granted work permits under the Pacific Access Category, as announced in 2001. The applicants register for the Pacific Access Category (PAC) ballots; the primary criterion is that the principal applicant must have a job offer from a New Zealand employer. Tuvaluans also have access to seasonal employment in the horticulture and viticulture industries in New Zealand under the Recognised Seasonal Employer (RSE) Work Policy introduced in 2007 allowing for employment of up to 5,000 workers from Tuvalu and other Pacific islands. In 2015 Tuvalu appointed Samuelu Laloniu as Tuvalu's first high commissioner, to be resident in Wellington after previously representing Tuvalu in the consulate office in Auckland. On 3 March 2019, NZ Foreign Affairs Minister Winston Peters and Prime Minister Enele Sopoaga signed the New Zealand-Tuvalu Statement of Partnership, which committed the governments of New Zealand and Tuvalu to work together on climate change, workforce development and regional security.

== Foreign policy issues ==
=== Support to the right of self-determination ===
In March 2017, at the 34th regular session of the UN Human Rights Council, Vanuatu made a joint statement on behalf of Tuvalu and some other Pacific nations raising human rights violations in the Western New Guinea, which has been occupied by Indonesia since 1963, and requested that the UN High Commissioner for Human Rights produce a report. Indonesia rejected Vanuatu's allegations. More than 100,000 Papuans have died during a 50-year Papua conflict. In September 2017, at the 72nd Session of the UN General Assembly, the Prime Ministers of Tuvalu, Vanuatu and the Solomon Islands once again raised human rights abuses in Indonesian-occupied West Papua.

=== Recognition of Palestine ===
On 10 September 2015, the United Nations General Assembly passed a Palestinian resolution to allow its flag to fly in front of the United Nations headquarters in New York. The vote was passed with 119 votes in support, 8 opposing, and 45 abstentions. Tuvalu was one of the eight opposing votes. Palestine had previously been granted UN "non-member observer state" status in 2012.

== See also ==
- List of diplomatic missions in Tuvalu
- List of diplomatic missions of Tuvalu
