= Australia–Tuvalu relations =

- Australia: Tuvalu

Diplomatic relations between Australia and Tuvalu were established in 1978, with the independence of Tuvalu, and both countries are members of the Commonwealth of Nations and share a head of state, King Charles III. Australia has had a High Commission in Funafuti since 2018. Tuvalu is not currently represented in Australia at the high commissioner or consular level.

== History ==
Australia has strong ties with Tuvalu; it was one of the three founding donating countries to the Tuvalu Trust Fund, and continues as a major donor of aid and technical assistance to Tuvalu. The official currency of Tuvalu from 1966 to 1976 was the Australian dollar, which strengthens the economic bonds between the two countries in particular. Since 1976, Tuvalu began issuing its own coinage (see Tuvaluan dollar) but the country continues to use Australian banknotes as official currency, and the value of the Tuvaluan currency is directly tied to the Australian dollar. In this regard, the Tuvaluan dollar is similar to the Faroese króna's relationship to the Danish krone as the Tuvaluan dollar is not an independent currency but has been assigned an ISO 4217 currency code, although it is treated as equivalent to the Australian dollar.

In August 2009, Australia signed a Pacific Partnership for Development between Australia and Tuvalu at the Pacific Islands Forum Leaders held in Cairns, Australia. Australia was (along with New Zealand and the United Kingdom) one of the three founding donating countries to the Tuvalu Trust Fund.

Australia is a major aid donor to Tuvalu. In 1994, even before the Pacific Partnership between the two countries was signed, Australia donated a Pacific-class patrol boat (HMTSS Te Mataili) provided by Australia under the Pacific Patrol Boat Program for use by the Tuvaluan police force for search and rescue missions and maritime surveillance and fishery patrol. Australia agreed to provide its maintenance until 2024 as well as training for its operation. Australia's Defence Cooperation Program supports Tuvalu's maritime police force with training, fresh water and supplies. On 7 April 2019, Australia donated a Guardian-class patrol boat that was named HMTSS Te Mataili II, and which was operated by the maritime surveillance unit of the Tuvalu Police Force. In 2023 Te Mataili II was damaged beyond repair by cyclones that struck Tuvalu. On 16 October 2024 Australia handed over a Guardian-class patrol boat to Tuvalu, which was named HMTSS Te Mataili III.

The government of Australia responded to the 2011 Tuvalu drought by working with New Zealand to supply temporary desalination plants; Australia also provide water tanks as part of the longer-term solution for the storage of available fresh water.

Tuvaluans can participate in the Australian Pacific Seasonal Worker Program, which allows Pacific Islanders to obtain seasonal employment in the Australian agriculture industry, in particular cotton and cane operations; fishing industry, in particular aquaculture; and with accommodation providers in the tourism industry.

Technical and vocational skills development (TVSD) in Tuvalu is supported by the Australian Pacific Training Coalition (APTC).

In May 2023 the Australian Infrastructure Financing Facility for the Pacific (AIFFP) approved the payment of AU$21.4m (US$15m) for a AUD120.6m (US$84.4m) Asian Development Bank (ADB) led fund to finance the construction of passenger and cargo facilities on Pacific Islands. The AIFFP funds, together with AU$11m (US$7.2m) of in-kind contribution from the Government of Tuvalu, are allocated to complete a project at Niutao and to implement a project at Nui, to construct workboat harbors, including constructing a navigation channel, boat ramp, passenger terminal, cargo shed, as well as shoreline reclamation.

== Australia–Tuvalu Falepili Union ==
On 9 November 2023, Tuvalu and Australia signed the Australia–Tuvalu Falepili Union, a bilateral treaty which covered migration, climate change, security arrangements and their bilateral diplomatic relationship. The treaty entered into force on 28 August 2024.

In the Tuvaluan language, Falepili describes the traditional values of good neighbourliness, care and mutual respect. The Treaty addresses climate change and security, with security threats encompassing major natural disasters, health pandemics and traditional security threats. The implementation of the Treaty will involve Australia increasing its contribution to the Tuvalu Trust Fund and the Tuvalu Coastal Adaptation Project. Australia will also provide a pathway for 280 citizens of Tuvalu to migrate to Australia each year to enable climate-related mobility for Tuvaluans.

Under the Falepili Union Australia and Tuvalu agreed to resolve any disputes bilaterally and not "involve any national or international tribunal or court or any other third party for resolution". Australia agreed to provide permanent residency for up to 280 Tuvaluans a year and provide funds to mitigate the effects of climate change. Australia agreed to assist Tuvalu in the event of "a major natural disaster", "a public health emergency of international concern" or "military aggression against Tuvalu". Tuvalu agreed to engage with Australia before "any partnership, arrangement or engagement with any other State or entity on security and defence-related matters".

The understanding of security that is applied in the Falepili Union is consistent with the Boe Declaration (2018) on regional security, which commits Pacific Islands Forum members to commit to core values, including good governance, liberty of the individual, democratic processes and indigenous rights. The Boe Declaration expanded the Biketawa Declaration (2000) to include issues of human security, environmental security, transnational crime, and cybersecurity.

== Controversy over the effect of the Falepili Union ==
The entry into the treaty has been criticised by Tuvaluan politicians as allowing Australia veto power over Tuvalu's foreign security agreements. Prime Minister Kausea Natano said the treaty was essential in preserving Tuvalu's identity. However, former Prime Minister Enele Sopoaga claimed the Falepili Union would undermine the country's sovereignty and vowed to repeal it should he head a government again after the election. Sopoaga emphasised the sensitivity of conserving the sovereignty of the Pacific Island nations amidst a period where bigger countries, such as the United States and China, are competing for influence in the region. Former Foreign Minister Simon Kofe also criticised the treaty and pledged to renegotiate with Australia. Kofe highlighted Tuvalu's contracts with numerous international companies, including those that provide the country with satellite connections and questioned if it were necessary for Tuvalu to require Australia's permission to engage with such companies.

In his first interview as prime minister, Feleti Teo said the part of the Falepili Union he wanted to revisit that both countries must "mutually agree" on any security arrangements that Tuvalu may want with other countries. In a later interview Teo said that "[i]f there is a way that stops short of revising the treaty that guarantees the integrity of the sovereignty of Tuvalu, then we will certainly explore those options." Subsequently Teo said he wanted arrangements to guarantee Tuvalu's sovereignty that "stop short of revising the treaty".

On 26 March 2024, Pat Conroy, Australia's Pacific minister, tabled the Falepili Union in the Australian Parliament for the propose of obtaining ratification. Conroy stated "[t]he new government of Tuvalu has confirmed its desire to proceed with the Falepili Union". The Falepili Union had been an issue in the 2024 Tuvaluan general election regarding its impact on the sovereignty of Tuvalu. Conroy confirmed that Australia would work with Tuvalu to ensure its sovereignty was respected. Conroy also stated that "Australia commits to assist Tuvalu in responding to a major natural disaster, a health pandemic, or military aggression. This is predicated on Tuvalu requesting such assistance."

== Australian High Commission in Tuvalu ==
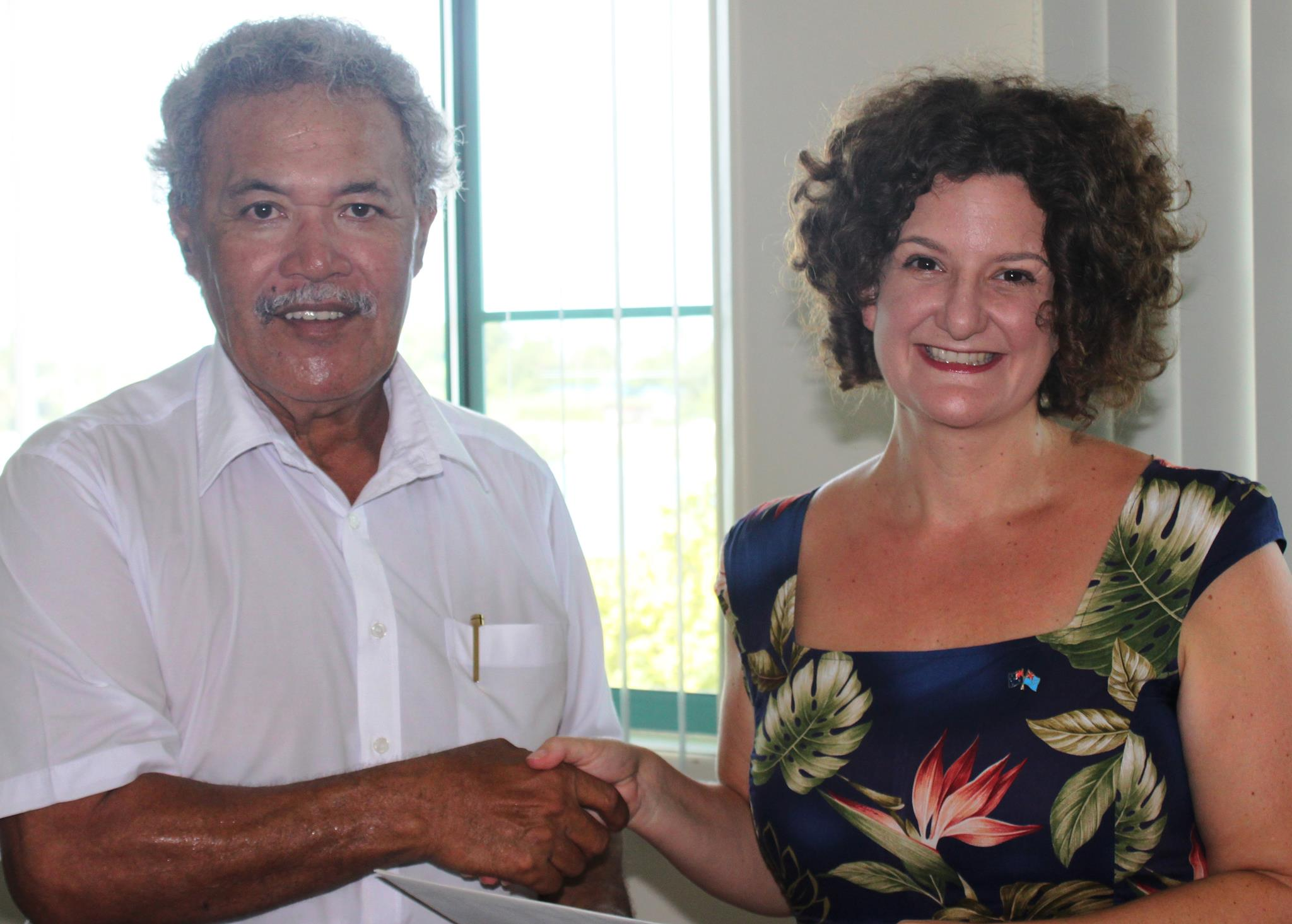
Australian Deputy High Commissioner to Fiji, Karinda D'Aloisio, presenting her credentials as High Commissioner to Tuvalu to Prime Minister Enele Sopoaga, 5 May 2015

In the 2018 Federal budget, Australia allocated funding to establish a High Commission in Tuvalu, becoming one of only two diplomatic missions in Tuvalu (the other being the Embassy of Taiwan). Prior to the appointment of the first resident high commissioner in October 2018, non-resident accreditation for Tuvalu was held by the Australian High Commission to Fiji (held by the High Commissioner from 1978 to 2014, and the Deputy High Commissioner from 2014 to 2018).

The new High Commission in Tuvalu Road, Vaiaku, Funafuti, was officially opened by Foreign Minister Payne on 7 February 2019.

== See also ==
- Foreign relations of Tuvalu
- Foreign relations of Australia
