= New Zealand–Tuvalu relations =

- New Zealand: Tuvalu

Diplomatic relations between New Zealand and Tuvalu were established in 1978, with the independence of Tuvalu, and both countries are members of the Commonwealth of Nations which share a head of state, King Charles III. New Zealand has had a High Commission in Funafuti since 2018. Tuvalu is not currently represented in New Zealand at the high commissioner or consular level.

== History ==
New Zealand has strong ties with Tuvalu and was one of the three founding donating countries to the Tuvalu Trust Fund and continues as a major donor of aid and technical assistance to Tuvalu. The government of New Zealand responded to the fresh-water crisis caused by the 2011 Tuvalu drought by supplying temporary desalination plants and personnel to repair existing desalination plants.

In 2015 a New Zealand aid programme will extend the implementation of renewable energy in Tuvalu. This project will result in the supply and installation of battery-backed solar photovoltaic (PV) systems that are to be located on Vaitupu, Nanumanga, Niutao and Nanumea, with the first hybrid system being built on Vaitupu in early 2015.

New Zealand has an annual quota of 75 Tuvaluans granted work permits under the Pacific Access Category, as announced in 2001. The applicants register for the Pacific Access Category (PAC) ballots; the primary criterion is that the principal applicant must have a job offer from a New Zealand employer. Tuvaluans also have access to seasonal employment in the horticulture and viticulture industries in New Zealand under the Recognised Seasonal Employer (RSE) Work Policy introduced in 2007 allowing for employment of up to 5,000 workers from Tuvalu and other Pacific islands.

In 2015 Tuvalu appointed Samuelu Laloniu as Tuvalu's first high commissioner, to be resident in Wellington after previously representing Tuvalu in the consulate office in Auckland.

On 3 March 2019, NZ Foreign Affairs Minister Winston Peters and Prime Minister Enele Sopoaga signed the New Zealand-Tuvalu Statement of Partnership, which committed the governments of New Zealand and Tuvalu to work together on climate change, workforce development and regional security.

== See also ==
- Foreign relations of Tuvalu
- Foreign relations of Australia
- Tuvaluan New Zealanders
