= Tuvalu–United Kingdom relations =

- Tuvalu: United Kingdom

Envoy
- Tuvalu House, London: British High Commission, Suva

Tuvalu–United Kingdom relations are the foreign and bilateral relations between Tuvalu and the United Kingdom.

Both countries share common membership of the Commonwealth, the United Nations, and the World Health Organization. Bilaterally the two countries have a Double Taxation Arrangement.

== History ==
Tuvalu (historically known as the Ellice Islands) was a British protectorate from 1892 to 1916, when it was incorporated into the Gilbert and Ellice Islands Colony. It became a separate Crown colony in 1974 following a self-determination referendum and achieved independence in 1978.

== Economic relations ==
Tuvalu is eligible to accede to the Pacific States–United Kingdom Economic Partnership Agreement, a free trade agreement with the United Kingdom.

Following the withdrawal of the United Kingdom from the European Union, the UK and Pacific States signed the Pacific States–United Kingdom Economic Partnership Agreement on 14 March 2019. The Pacific States–United Kingdom Economic Partnership Agreement is a continuity trade agreement, based on the EU free trade agreement, which entered into force on 1 January 2021. Trade value between the Pacific States and the United Kingdom was worth £286 million in 2022.

== Diplomatic missions ==
- Tuvalu maintains an honorary consulate in London.
- The United Kingdom is not accredited to Tuvalu through a high commission; the UK develops relations through its high commission in Suva, Fiji.

== See also ==
- Foreign relations of Tuvalu
- Foreign relations of the United Kingdom
- Tuvalu Trust Fund
