= Cuba–Tuvalu relations =

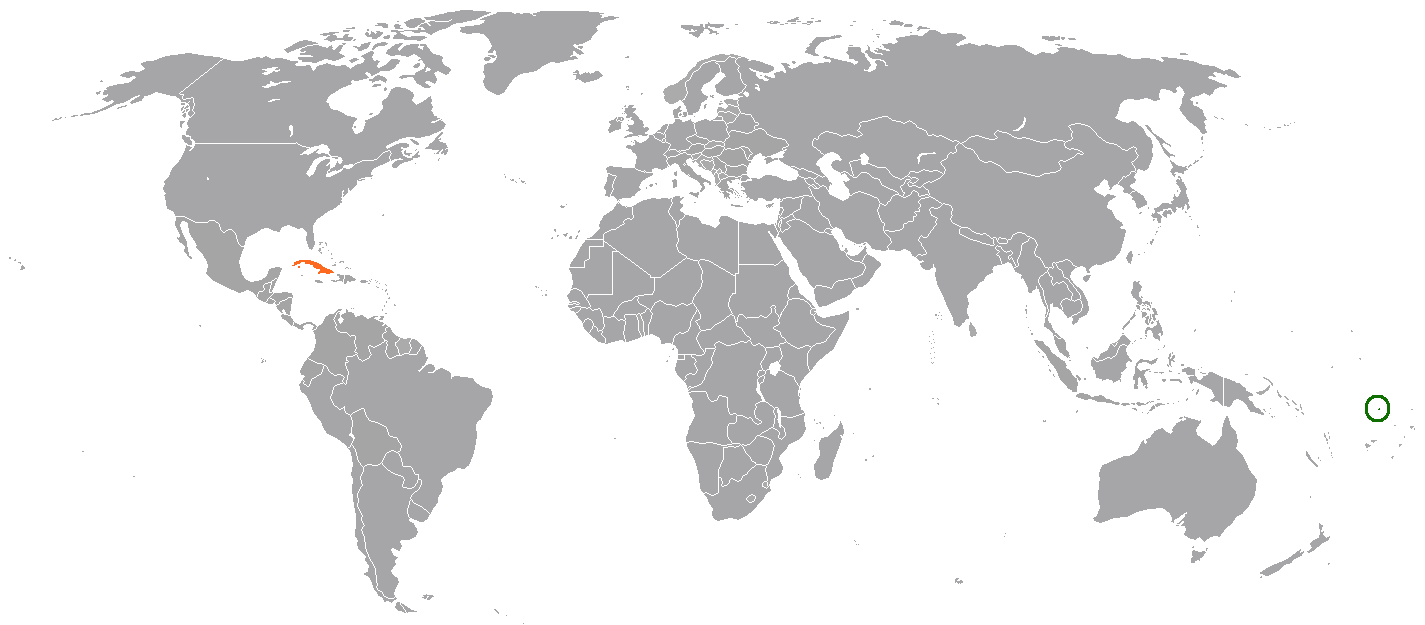

- Tuvalu: Cuba

Relations between Tuvalu and the Republic of Cuba are recent, having developed in the 2000s (decade). Like other countries in Oceania, Tuvalu is a beneficiary of Cuban medical aid; bilateral relations between Funafuti and Havana must be viewed within the scope of Cuba's regional policy in Oceania.

== History ==
In September 2008, Prime Minister Apisai Ielemia was the first Tuvaluan leader to pay a State visit to Cuba, during a first ever Cuba-Pacific ministerial meeting in Havana. The meeting focused on "strengthening co-operation in health, sports and education", and Cuba pledged assistance to Pacific Island countries in facing the effects of climate change - a particularly important issue for Tuvalu.

As of June 2009, there are three Cuban doctors providing specialised medical care in Tuvalu, one having arrived in October 2008 and two more in February 2009. Prensa Latina reported that these doctors had "inaugurated a series of new health services in Tuvalu". They had reportedly "attended 3,496 patients, and saved 53 lives", having "opened ultrasound and abortion services, as well as specialized consultations on hypertension, diabetes, and chronic diseases in children". They had visited all the country's islands, and were training local staff in "primary health care, and how to deal with seriously ill patients, among other subjects".

== See also ==
- Foreign relations of Cuba
- Foreign relations of Tuvalu
