= Fiji–Tuvalu relations =

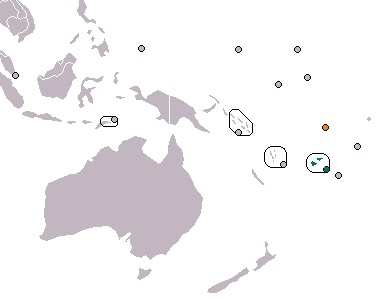

- Fiji: Tuvalu

Diplomatic mission
- No permanent mission: Tuvaluan High Commission in Suva

Envoy
- High Commissioner H.E. William Toganivalu: High Commissioner H.E. Dr. Eselealofa Apinelu

Fiji–Tuvalu relations are diplomatic and other relations between Fiji and Tuvalu.

The countries are neighbours in the vast expanse of the Pacific Ocean; Tuvalu lies directly north of Fiji, and they share a maritime border. Tuvalu is by far the smaller, lesser developed and more remote of the two countries, and is therefore dependent on its close relationship with Fiji. The two countries established formal diplomatic relations in 1979, the year after Tuvalu's independence from the United Kingdom.

Dr. Eselealofa Apinelu is Tuvalu's current High Commissioner to Fiji. On 21 December 2023 William Toganivalu was appointed as Fiji's roving ambassador to the Pacific island countries and territories and agencies of the council of regional organisations in the Pacific.

Both Fiji and Tuvalu are full members of the Commonwealth of Nations.

== History ==
Fiji and Tuvalu share ties dating back to the 19th century as part of the British Empire. The Ellice Islands (Tuvalu's colonial name) were made a British protectorate in 1892 and placed under the jurisdiction of the Fiji-based Western Pacific High Commission, with administrative links remaining until 1952. After the Second World War, Tuvalu's first doctors were trained at the Fiji School of Medicine, while some of the Tuvaluans from the overcrowded atoll of Vaitupu moved permanently to the island of Kioa, in Fiji, where they and their descendants still live. Fiji remains Tuvalu's gateway to the outside world. The only flights to and from Funafuti International Airport are via Suva, on Air Fiji.

When the Commander of Fiji's military, Commodore Voreqe Bainimarama, took power in Fiji in a coup in 2006, Tuvalu did not join countries such as Australia, New Zealand or Samoa in condemning the new regime. Tuvalu remained supportive of Bainimarama's statements that he would restore democracy on his own schedule. Akuila Yabaki, of the Citizens' Constitutional Forum in Fiji, noted that Tuvalu had little choice in the matter, as it was heavily dependent on maintaining good relations with Fiji.

In 2013, Sir Gordon Ward, a British national serving as Chief Justice of Tuvalu, was a denied a visa by the Fijian government to transit via Fiji on his flight to Tuvalu. Ward had previously sat as a judge in Fiji's Court of Appeal, before resigning in protest against the 2006 coup. As there are no flights into Tuvalu other than through Fiji, Tuvalu's Chief Justice was unable to enter Tuvalu. Fiji remained unresponsive to Tuvalu's attempts to resolve the matter, although the incident was said not to have severely affected bilateral relations.

== Agreements ==
In October 2014, the Prime Ministers of Fiji and Tuvalu signed the Fiji-Tuvalu Maritime Boundary Treaty, which establishes the extent of the national areas of jurisdiction between Fiji and Tuvalu as recognized in international law under the 1982 United Nations Convention on the Law of the Sea.

In December 2014, a technical agreement was signed between Fiji, Tuvalu and France at the Commonwealth Secretariat's headquarters in London over maritime boundaries. This agreement uses satellite data to pinpoint where the waters of Fiji, Tuvalu and the French territories of Wallis and Futuna meet. The agreement will help the countries to defend their waters from illegal fishing operations and provide clarity over rights to marine natural resources.

== Educational cooperation ==
Fiji continues to provide most of Tuvaluans' higher education and vocational training, through the University of the South Pacific (USP) and the Fiji National University. Tuvalu does not have its own universities. Students attending the USP at its campus in Funafuti, Tuvalu, rather than its main campus in Fiji, "can listen to lectures broadcast from Fiji, use audio and video-conferencing facilities and employ the USPNet system for communication with lecturers and other students".

== Diplomatic missions ==
Tuvalu's High Commission building is in Suva. Fiji in turn does not maintain any diplomatic presence in Tuvalu, but does have a "roving ambassador" accredited to ten independent Pacific Island states, including Tuvalu.

== See also ==
- Foreign relations of Fiji
- Foreign relations of Tuvalu
