= Tuvalu Order of Merit =

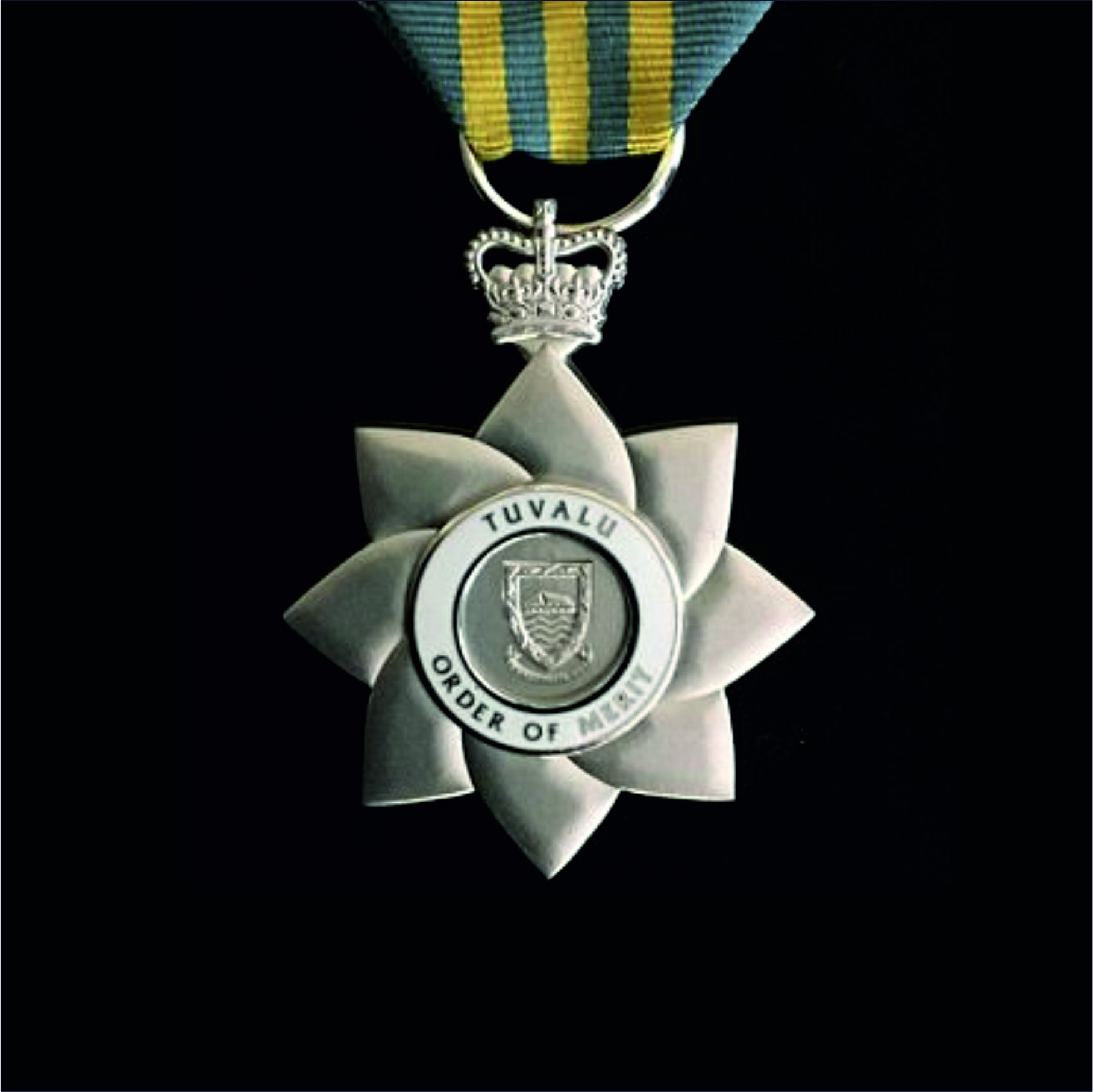
- Obverse of order

Awarded by the Monarch of Tuvalu
- Type: Order of Merit
- Status: Currently constituted
- Founder: Elizabeth II
- Sovereign: Charles III

Precedence
- Next (higher): None
- Next (lower): None
- Ribbon bar of the order

The Tuvalu Order of Merit is an order of merit of Tuvalu. It was founded on 1 October 2016, on the 38th anniversary of Tuvaluan independence; with $30,000 for the award allocated in the Tuvalu 2017 National Budget.

== Discussion of award ==
At Kensington Palace on 30 October 2017, Prince William received His Excellency Sir Iftikhar Ayaz (Honorary Consul-General of Tuvalu) who invested His Royal Highness and the then Duchess of Cambridge with the Tuvalu Order of Merit on behalf of the Governor-General of Tuvalu. The award was given to the Prince and Princess of Wales in recognition of their visit to Tuvalu as part of the Diamond Jubilee of Queen Elizabeth II.

== Recipients ==
=== Tuvalu Order of Merit ===
- William, Prince of Wales - 30 October 2017
- Catherine, Princess of Wales - 30 October 2017

=== Medal of the Tuvalu Order of Merit ===
- Major General Alastair Bruce of Crionaich - 19 July 2017
