= Tuvalu House =

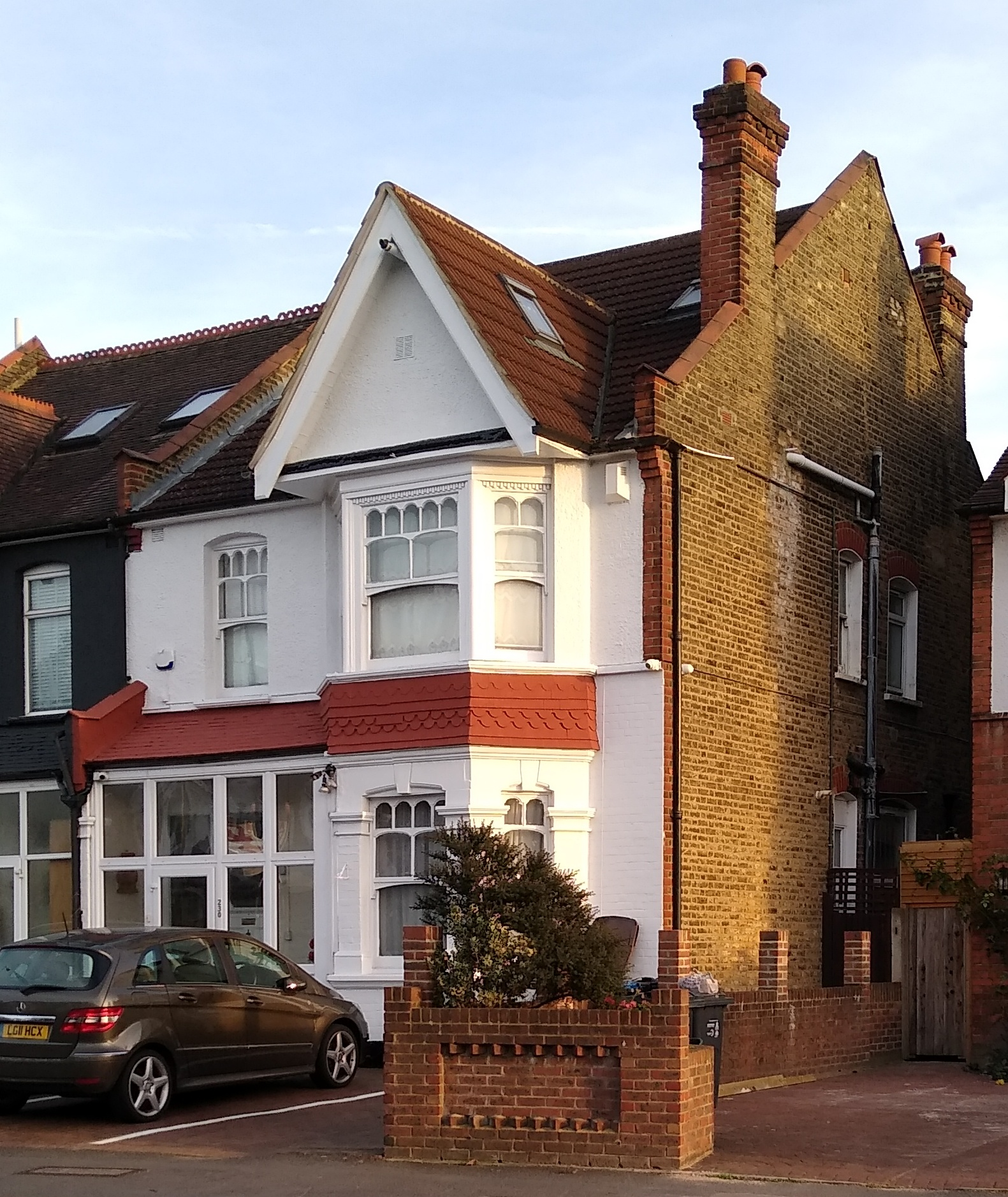
- Address: Wimbledon; London, SW20
- Coordinates: 51.4120°N 0.2245°W
- High Commissioner: Sir Iftikhar A. Ayaz

Tuvalu House is the honorary consulate of the Government of Tuvalu, located at 230 Worple Road in the Wimbledon area of London, England.

== Background ==
Since independence in 1978, Tuvalu has been a Commonwealth realm, with the Governor-General of Tuvalu representing His Majesty the King in Tuvalu. Based from Tuvalu House, Sir Iftikhar A. Ayaz has represented the Government of Tuvalu in London in since 1996 at a consular level.

Since the Government of Tuvalu does not have a large, organized consular or diplomatic service, it has generally preferred to engage in ad hoc trade or political missions, where the need arises. Other than Tuvalu's High Commission in Fiji, and other contacts in the Pacific region, Tuvalu House is thus somewhat of an exception as an overseas office representing Tuvalu. Tuvalu only maintains one embassy in Europe, in Brussels, as well as an Honorary Consulate in Switzerland and Germany.

Tuvalu has no High Commissioner in the United Kingdom, and its representation there is led by the honorary consul, Iftikhar Ayaz. According to a profile of him, Ayaz previously worked with UN organizations including the FAO, UNESCO and UNDP and, as a Commonwealth expert, initiated an Education For Life programme for small island states in the Pacific. He was appointed an OBE in 1998 and received an honorary knighthood in the 2015 Queen's Birthday Honours for services to Tuvalu.

The same profile says he was awarded the Queen's Medal for humanitarian services in 2020 and was named the Tuvaluan government's special envoy to the UN Human Rights Council in 2019. From the consulate he has campaigned on the threat of rising sea levels to Tuvalu, reciting a poem on the subject at a Commonwealth Foundation event. According to a community profile, he has also spoken at climate conferences and at universities in Europe and the United Kingdom. A directory listing says the consulate is open on weekdays by appointment.

== See also ==
- Foreign relations of Tuvalu
