= Tuvalu Police Force =

Law enforcement agency

- Police emblem

Agency overview
- Legal personality: Police force

Jurisdictional structure
- Operations jurisdiction: Tuvalu
- General nature: Local civilian police

Operational structure
- Headquarters: Funafuti
- Elected officer responsible: Simon Kofe, Minister for Justice

The Tuvalu Police Force is the national Police force of Tuvalu, it is headquartered in Funafuti and includes a Maritime Surveillance Unit, Customs, Prisons and Immigration. Police officers wear British style uniforms.

== Police powers and responsibilities ==
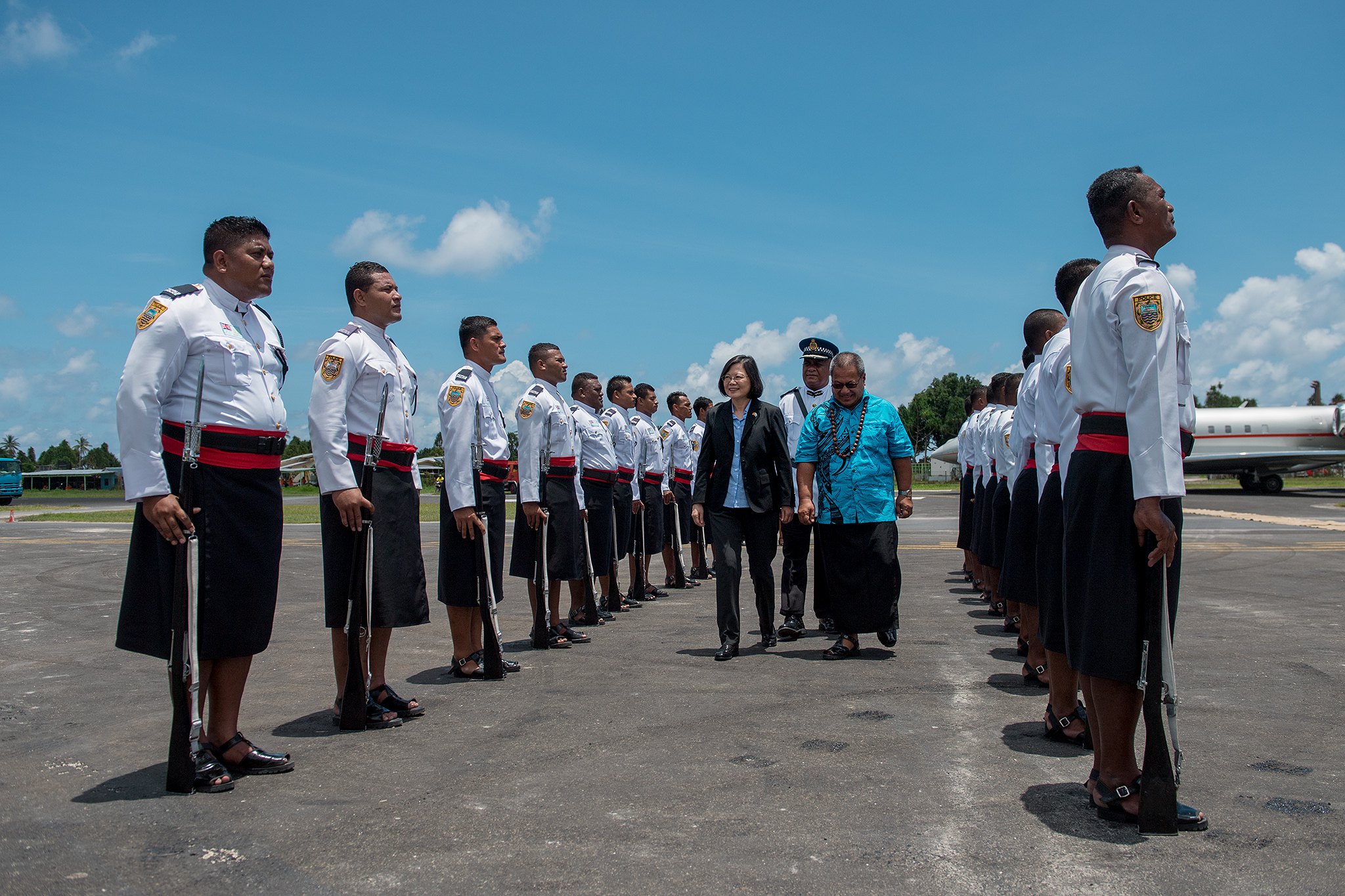
Tuvalu Police Honour Guard welcome Taiwanese President Tsai Ing-wen in 2017

The police service is managed in accordance with the Police Powers and Duties Act (2009) and the Police Powers and Duties Regulations (2012). The powers of arrest and search are described in Part III of the Criminal Procedure Code (1963).

The Penal Code (1965) is a codification of what crimes under Law of Tuvalu. This legislation is published online by the Office of the Attorney General of Tuvalu; also by the Pacific Islands Legal Information Institute, with the law set out in the 2008 Revised Edition; with a list of current legislation (up to 2012).

== Status under the Constitution of Tuvalu ==
According to the Constitution of Tuvalu,

161. The Police Force

(1) An office of Commissioner of Police is established as an office in the Tuvalu Police.

(2) The Commissioner of Police shall be appointed in accordance with section 163(5)(a) (which relates to the appointment of the Commissioner of Police).

(3) Excluding the Commissioner of Police, members of the Tuvalu Police of or above the rank of Inspector (or the equivalent rank as defined by or under an Act of Parliament) maybe appointed, removed and disciplined in the same manner, with any necessary modifications, as members of the Public Service under section 159 (the Public Service).

(4) Other members of the Tuvalu Police maybe appointed, removed and disciplined by the Commissioner of Police, subject to appeal to the Public Service Commission in the case of removal or disciplinary action.

(5) The Director of Public Prosecution may initiate criminal proceedings against any Police Officer.

Tuvalu Police Force patch

== Role in maritime surveillance ==
The HMTSS Te Mataili, a Pacific Forum patrol vessel, given to Tuvalu, from Australia, from October 1994 to early 2019. Australia agreed to provide these vessels to smaller neighbours in the Pacific Forum, after the United Nations Convention on Laws of the Seas extended maritime nations Exclusive Economic Zones to 200 kilometers. Australia agreed its own security was improved if it gave its smaller neighbours vessels that enabled them to protect their own sovereignty, perform search and rescue, fishery patrol, and prevent smuggling. Australia replaced the Te Mataili with a larger and more capable Guardian class patrol vessel in April, 2019, named HMTSS Te Mataili II.

Te Mataili II was severely damaged by cyclones in 2023. On 16 October 2024 Australia handed over a Guardian-class patrol boat to Tuvalu, which was named HMTSS Te Mataili III.

In May 2023 the Government of Tuvalu signed a Memorandum of Understanding (MoU) with Sea Shepherd Conservation Society, which is based in the Netherlands, to combat illegal, unreported, and unregulated (IUU) fishing in Tuvalu’s Exclusive Economic Zone (EEZ). Sea Shepherd will provide the Allankay, a 54.6 metres (179 ft) motor vessel, to support Tuvalu’s law enforcement activities as part of "Operation Tuvalu". Allankay will accommodate officers from the Tuvalu Police Force, who have the authority to board, inspect, and arrest fishing vessels engaged in IUU activity in Tuvalu’s EEZ. According to Sea Shepherd, they had allegedly captured 9.5km of fishing gear by July 2024 in co-operation with Tuvaluan authorities.

== Regional Assistance Mission to Solomon Islands ==
Tuvalu provided police officers to the Regional Assistance Mission to Solomon Islands from December 2004. Tuvaluan Police officer Fanini Maleko was the contingent commander of the Tuvaluan police serving as part of RAMSI's Participating Police Force (PPF).

== Social institutions of Tuvalu ==
Each island has its own high-chief, or ulu-aliki, and several sub-chiefs (alikis). The community council is the Falekaupule (the traditional assembly of elders) or te sina o fenua (literally: "grey-hairs of the land"). As defined in the Falekaupule Act (1997), Falekaupule means "traditional assembly in each island...composed in accordance with the Aganu of each island". Aganu means traditional customs and culture.

Section 41 and Schedule 3 of the Falekaupule Act (1997) provides that “[i]t shall be the duty of every Falekaupule and of every Kaupule to use its resources to assist the police in the detection and prevention of crime within the area of its authority.”

== Ranks of the Tuvalu Police Force ==
Below is a table stating the ranks and insignia used by the Tuvalu Police Force.

Rank	Commissioner	Inspector	Sergeant	Corporal	Constable
Insignia					
