= Iftikhar A. Ayaz =

UK-based Tanzanian campaigner, diplomat for Tuvalu

Sir Iftikhar Ahmad Ayaz KBE CMG
- Born: Qadian, India
- Citizenship: Tanzanian
- Occupation: Honorary consul for Tuvalu in the United Kingdom
- Known for: Environmental activism; Human rights campaigning
- Movement: Ahmaddiya

Sir Iftikhar Ahmad Ayaz Sahib KBE CMG is a former Tanzanian government officer and international human rights and environmental campaigner who serves as honorary consul for Tuvalu to the United Kingdom, based in London. He has campaigned to raise international awareness about the effects of climate change on Tuvalu, which could be underwater by 2040 or 2050. Over the course of his career, he has been involved with several United Nations organizations, including the UN Working Group of the Rights of Minorities, UNESCO, and the United Nations Development Programme.

In 2016, he was honoured with the award of Knight Commander of the British Empire by Queen Elizabeth II. In 2017, he invested Prince William with the Tuvalu Order of Merit on behalf of the Governor-General of Tuvalu at Kensington Palace. In 2020, Sir Iftikhar Ahmad Ayaz was awarded the Queen's Medal for humanitarian service; he was awarded the Queen's Platinum Jubilee Medal in 2022. He was appointed Companion of the Order of St Michael and St George (CMG) in the 2025 Birthday Honours for services to Tuvalu.

== Early life and education ==
Iftikhar Ayaz received his early education in Qadian, India. His father, Mukhtar Ahmad Ayaz, was a pioneer in the Ahmadiyya Muslim Jama'at movement.

In 1946, he moved to Tanzania, then Tanganyika Territory, eventually settling with his father in Tanga, Tanzania, where Iftikhar Ayaz received his secondary education. He then trained as a teacher in Nairobi, Kenya.

The government of Tanzania later sent him to Britain, where he earned a master's degree in linguistics. He also holds doctorates in human development and education.

== Career ==
=== Education officer ===
In 1958, he entered government service in Tanzania, in the department of education. He was a deputy inspector of English medium schools and a district education officer based in Dar es Salaam. In 1963, he was sent to the western region of Tanzania, where he became a regional inspector of schools.

=== Honorary consul for Tuvalu ===
Based in London, Ayaz serves as the honorary consul for the Commonwealth realm of Tuvalu. He has argued publicly that Tuvalu has not received its fair share of profits from the Internet country code top-level domain .tv, particularly with the rise in popularity of Internet video. In raising awareness for the possible destruction of Tuvalu due to climate change, he has stated publicly that he is frustrated with the "defeatist" attitudes which have focused on ways to relocate the Tuvaluan people to New Zealand and Australia.

=== Human rights campaigner ===
He has worked closely with a number of United Nations bodies, including the UN Working Group for the Rights of Minorities, as well as the Food and Agriculture Organisation, UNESCO, and the United Nations Development Programme. In addition, Ayaz served on the global board of advisors for the International Commission of Peace (ICOP).

In 2013, Ayaz spoke at the 22nd session of the United Nations Human Rights Council in Geneva, Switzerland. He presented the case of the Ahmadiyya in Pakistan, who are not allowed to practise Islam as their faith and are denied the right to vote unless they reject allegiance to their leader. In 2019, he spoke out against Pakistan-bred terrorism in front of the UNHRC, along with other Ahmadiyya community leaders.

== Personal life ==
An active member of the Ahmadiyya Muslim Jama'at, Ayaz established a Jama'at centre in Bukoba, Tanzania, in 1964, as well as a centre in Arusha.

In 1969, he renounced his British citizenship to become a citizen of Tanzania.

As of 2018, he served as ambassador of the Universal Peace Federation, Ahmadiyya Community, in the United Kingdom.

== See also ==
- Tuvalu#Foreign relations
