= Tuvalu Coastal Adaptation Project =

Climate change adaptation project

- Abbreviation: TCAP
- Formation: 30 July 2017; 9 years ago
- Dissolved: Project completion date - 7 December 2025 (provisional)
- Type: Public works
- Purpose: Building capacity to meet challenges of climate change and sea-level rise affecting the islands of Tuvalu
- Headquarters: Partnership House, Vaiaku, Funafuti, Tuvalu
- Coordinates: 08°31′16″S 179°11′54″E
- National Designated Authority: Honorable Minister of Finance Panapasi Nelesoni
- National Project Manager: Alan Puga Resture
- Main organ: Board
- Affiliations: Green Climate Fund; UNDP; Pacific Community (SPC)
- Website: tcap.tv

The Tuvalu Coastal Adaptation Project (TCAP) was launched in 2017 to meet the challenges to Tuvalu resulting from climate change and sea-level rise affecting the islands of Tuvalu. Tuvalu was the first country in the Pacific to access climate finance from Green Climate Fund, with the support of the UNDP.

The day-to-day activities of TCAP are managed by a team located within Tuvalu’s Climate Change and Policy Unit, with TCAP’s Project Management Unit reporting to the Project Board. TCAP is intended to run for 7 years. Projects that are part of TCAP are works on Funafuti to provide a platform above the level of storm surges, and projects on the outer islands of Nanumea and Nanumaga that aimed at reducing exposure to coastal erosion by providing a buffer during storms.

TCAP is also intended to build the capacity of the national government on Funafuti and island local communities to adapt to climate change.

== Project Funding ==
US$36 million was provided by the Green Climate Fund and US$2.9 million co-financing from the Government of Tuvalu. The Australian Department of Foreign Affairs and Trade (DFAT) also provided funding for the TCAP of AU$2 million to TCAP, to assist in covering additional costs related to COVID-19.

On 10 November 2023, Tuvalu signed the Falepili Union, a bilateral diplomatic relationship with Australia, under which Australia will increase its contribution to TCAP and the Tuvalu Trust Fund. Australia will also provide an pathway for citizens of Tuvalu to migrate to Australia, to enable climate-related mobility for Tuvaluans.

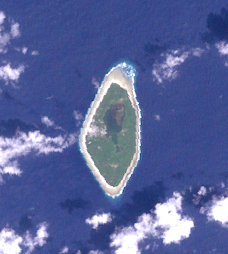
Nanumanga

== Nanumaga ==
The implementation of the TCAP on Nanumaga was the construction of a berm top barriers on the crest of the main natural storm berm that runs parallel to the foreshore area of the main village on the western coast of Nanumaga.

The berm top barriers consists of 665 metres (2,182 ft) of buried geotextile mega containers, each approximately 20 metres (66 ft) long, which raises the height of the storm berm by around 1.5 metres (4.9 ft).

== Nanumea ==
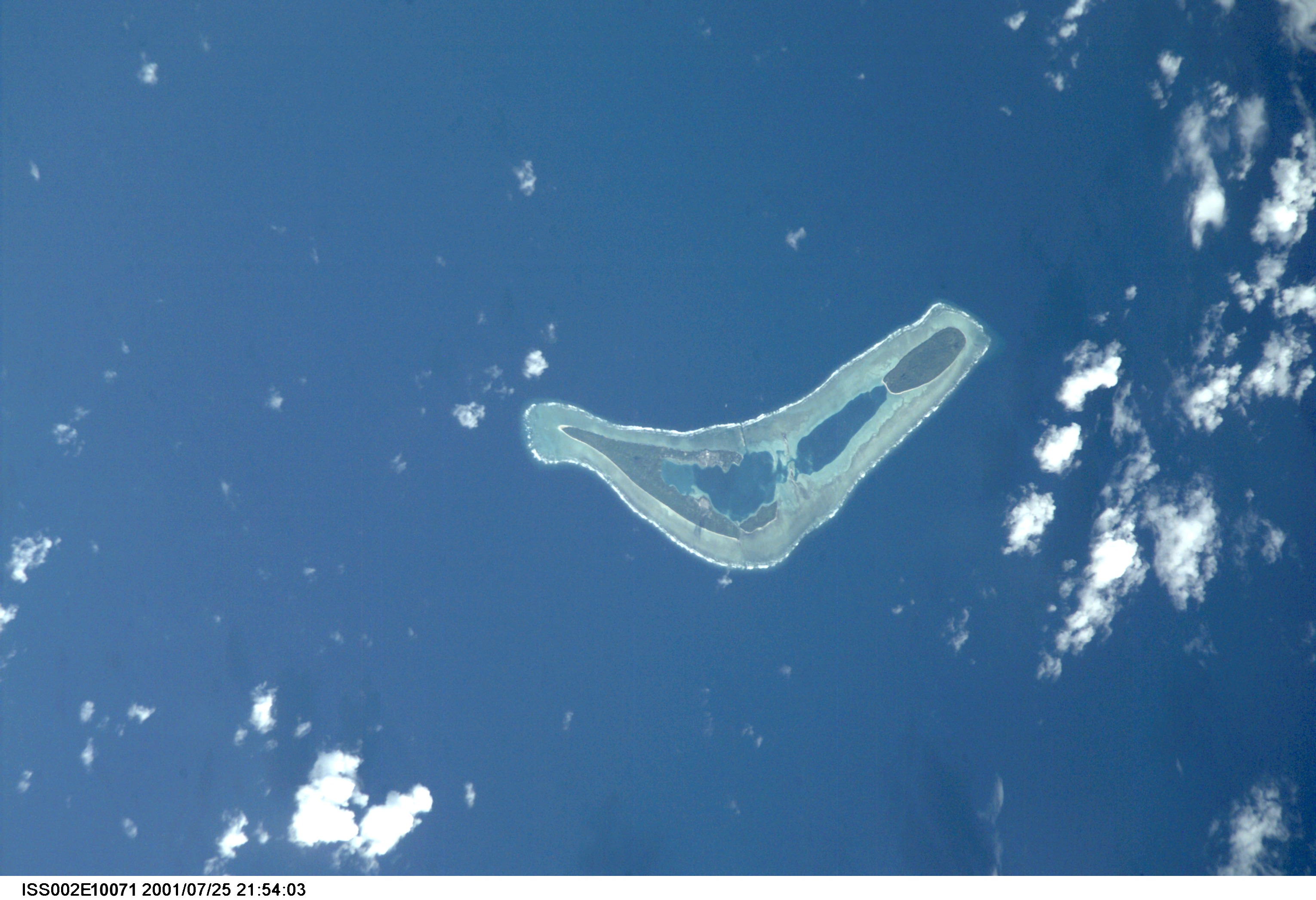
Nanumanga

The implementation of the TCAP on Nanumea, was the construction of berm top barriers along the crest of the main natural storm berm, which is intended to protect approximately 1,500 metres (4,900 ft) of high value shoreline. For approximately 160 metres (520 ft) of coastline in front of the church, following consultation with the Falekaupule, it is proposed to reinstate the former shore by constructing a new seawall made from precast concrete interlocking Seabee units, which are concrete hexagonal blocks with a hollow core, where there are the remnants of existing but crumbling hard coastal protection measures.

== Funafuti reclamation ==
Tuvalu land reclamation program as of 2025

The implementation of the TCAP on Funafuti was a land reclamation project, which commenced in December 2022. Sand was dredged from the lagoon to construct a platform on Fongafale islet that is 780 metres (2,560 ft) meters long and 100 metres (330 ft) meters wide, giving a total area of approximately 7.8 ha. (19.27 acres), which is designed to remain above sea level rise and the reach of storm waves beyond the year 2100.

The platform starts from the northern boundary of the Queen Elizabeth Park (QEP) reclamation area and extend to the northern Tausoa Beach Groyne and the Catalina Ramp Harbour.

== Coastal hazard online modelling platform ==
The Pacific Community (SPC) collaborated with TCAP to create an online platform that provides Tuvalu with the ability to identify, plan for, and reduce risks associated with sea level rise and more frequent intense storms driven by climate change. The online platform covers all nine of Tuvalu’s atolls and islands. It allows the government, and local communities to make informed development decisions in relation to where to build on the islands of Tuvalu. It includes coastal inundation modelling due to sea level rise and storm waves, shoreline change detection and monitoring, damage and loss, and tools to identify marine hazards exposure.

== Topographic and Bathymetric Survey ==
In May 2019, TCAP signed an agreement with Fugro, for it to carry out an airborne LIDAR (Light Detection and Ranging) survey across the nine islands of Tuvalu. LIDAR is a remote sensing method that uses light in the form of a pulsed laser that will produce high quality mapping of the reef and lagoon bathymetry (sea floor mapping to 50-meter depths) and accurate topography (land elevation data). This aerial survey will provide high quality baseline data to assess the relationship between water levels and wave dynamics and their impact on the islands of Tuvalu. The survey will also provide baseline data for shoreline monitoring, coastal vulnerability assessment and planning.
