= HMTSS Te Mataili =

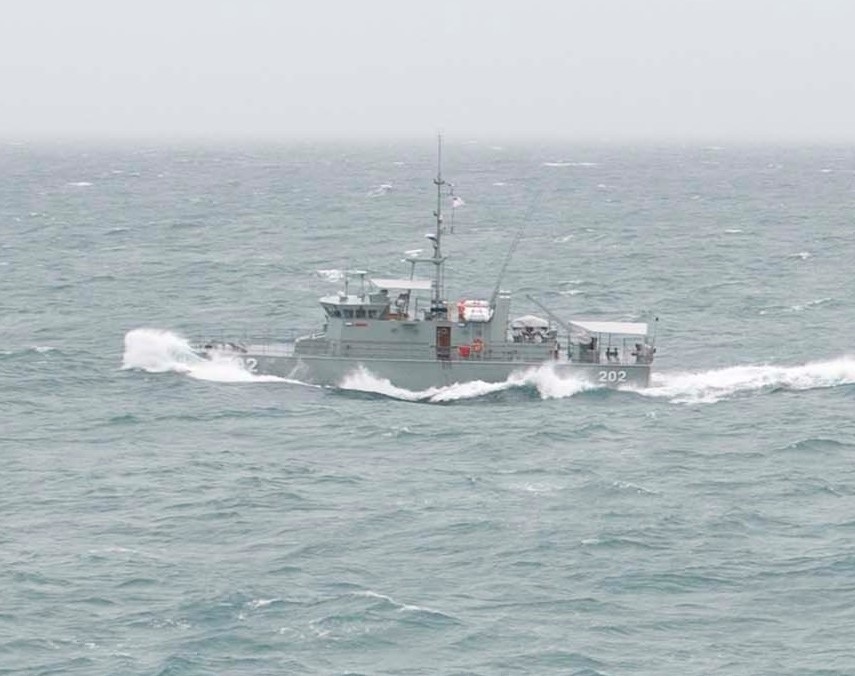
- Sister ship RFNS Kikau

History

Tuvalu
- Name: Te Mataili
- Launched: 1994
- Status: Decommissioned

General characteristics
- Class & type: Pacific Forum-class patrol boat
- Displacement: 162 tons
- Length: 103 ft (31 m)

HMTSS Te Mataili (801) was a Pacific Forum-class patrol vessel provided by Australia to Tuvalu, and operated by the Tuvalu Police Force. Tuvalu has a 900,000 square kilometres (350,000 sq mi) exclusive economic zone, and Te Mataili was its sole long range patrol vessel, until it was retired, and replaced by the larger and more modern Te Mataili II.

== Background ==
When the United Nations Convention on the Laws of the Seas established that all maritime nations were entitled to exercise control over a 200-kilometre (120 mi) exclusive economic zone, Australia agreed to give small patrol vessels to 12 of the smaller nations of the Pacific Forum to improve regional maritime security.

== Design ==
Australia designed the patrol vessels using commercial off-the-shelf equipment, to make it easier to maintain the vessels in small, remote, shipyards.

== Operational history ==
The International Work Group for Indigenous Affairs an international human rights group, questioned how the government used Te Mataili after it invoked Tuvalu's Public Order Act, suspending public gatherings, for 14 days, in January 2011. It was moored near the official residences of the Governor General and Prime Minister. Some commentators expressed that, if her crew were armed it would have eroded Tuvalu's peaceful traditions.

In October 2011 the government of Tuvalu had to declare a state of emergency when potable water reserves dropped to a dangerous level. Te Mataili carried a Red Cross desalinization unit to Nukulaelae.

On March 3, 2017, Te Mataili rescued two distressed fishers, off Fuafatu.

Te Mataili escorted Nivaga III, carrying Polynesian leaders to Amatuka, on July 5, 2018. On November 22, 2018 Te Mataili carried the body of former Prime Minister Apisai Ielemia from the capital to his home island, Vaitupu.

Te Mataili was replaced by Te Mataili II, a Guardian-class patrol vessel, which was launched on November 26, 2018, and commissioned on April 5, 2019. Like all other redundant Pacific Forum vessels Te Mataili was returned to Australia for recycling.
