= Tuvalu Trust Fund =

Sovereign wealth fund of Tuvalu

- Company type: Sovereign wealth fund
- Industry: Institutional investor
- Genre: "binary trust fund structure". The binary structure consists of an endowment fund and a revolving fund.
- Founded: 1987
- Founder: United Kingdom, Australia, New Zealand and the government of Tuvalu.
- Headquarters: Tuvalu, Australia and New Zealand
- Key people: Professional Fund Managers - two Australian based firms - manage the fund on a day-to-day basis
- Total assets: AUD$191 million (at end of 2022)

The Tuvalu Trust Fund is an international sovereign wealth fund established to benefit Tuvalu, a small, central Pacific island nation, by providing income to cover shortfalls in the national budget, underpin economic development, and help the nation achieve greater financial autonomy. The Tuvalu Trust Fund was established in 1987 by the United Kingdom, Australia and New Zealand.

The International Monetary Fund (IMF) 2014 Country Report noted the market value of the Tuvalu Trust Fund dropped during the 2008 financial crisis; however, the IMF 2016 Country Report estimates the total value of the fund had recovered to be AUD$131 million in 2012. The policy of the Tuvaluan government has been to grow the maintained value of the Consolidated Investment Fund (CIF), from which the government can draw funds for government expenditure; during 2016-2020 the government was able to save an average of 6.6% of GDP into the CIF.

In 2022, the value of the Tuvalu Trust Fund was approximately $190 million. In 2021 the market value of the TTF rose by 12 percent to its highest level on record (261 percent of GDP). However, the volatility in global equity markets in 2022 resulted in the TTF’s value falling by 7 percent as compared to the end of 2021.

== History ==
An agreement to establish the trust fund was signed in Suva, Fiji on 16 June 1987 by representatives of the governments of Tuvalu, Australia, New Zealand and the United Kingdom. The involvement of the United Kingdom in the Suva Agreement was the consequence of Tuvalu having been a Crown colony until 1978, when Tuvalu became an independent nation. Australia and New Zealand became involved in the Suva Agreement as part of the aid programs of those countries to the island nations in the South Pacific, which have limited natural resources or sources of government revenue. The purpose of the fund (as stated in the Suva Agreement) was to contribute to the long-term financial viability of Tuvalu by providing an additional source of revenue for recurrent expenses of the Government of Tuvalu.

On 10 November 2023, Tuvalu signed the Falepili Union, a bilateral diplomatic relationship with Australia, under which Australia will increase its contribution to the Tuvalu Trust Fund and to the Tuvalu Coastal Adaptation Project (TCAP). Australia will also provide an pathway for citizens of Tuvalu to migrate to Australia, to enable climate-related mobility for Tuvaluans.

== Growth of the Fund ==
At the commencement of the trust fund, Tuvalu provided A$1.6 million, the United Kingdom donated A$8.5m, Australia A$8.0m and New Zealand A$8.3m. Japan later donated A$700,000, then South Korea later donated A$30,000, bringing the total up to about A$27.1 million. The United Kingdom withdrew from the agreement in 2004. Australia and New Zealand continue to support the Tuvalu Trust Fund and provide other forms of development assistance. Japan and South Korea have also made donations to the fund. Tuvalu's initial contribution to the fund was AUD$1.6 million and Tuvaluan contributions total AUD$29.8 million, which makes Tuvalu the major contributor to the Fund.

As the result of successful investments made by the fund managers, the initial assets of AUD$27 million grew to AUD$66 million in 2000. In the first twenty years of operation to 30 June 2007, the real rate of return on the fund has averaged 6.2 percent per annum providing AUD$65.7 million in revenue to Tuvalu, of which AUD$24.1 million has been used to help fund budget deficits; AUD$29.2 million has been reinvested in the fund; and AUD$12.4 million was held in the CIF and was available to be drawn down by the Government of Tuvalu. The performance of the Tuvalu Trust Fund and the Consolidated Investment Fund (CIF) from 2010 to 2018 was as follows:

Fund	2010	2011	2012	2013	2014	2015	2016	2017	2018
Tuvalu Trust Fund	A$108 million	A$119 million	A$131 million	A$141 million	A$144 million	A$150 million	A$165 million	A$175 million	A$179 million
Consolidated Investment Fund	A$7.2 million	A$3.2 million	A$4.5 million	A$12.2 million	A$24.3 million	A$26 million	A$27 million	A$22 million	A$34 million

The 2022 to 2025 values of the Tuvalu Trust Fund and the Consolidated Investment Fund (CIF), are as follows:

Fund	2022	2023	2024 est.	2025 proj.
Tuvalu Trust Fund	A$234.6 million	A$266.5 million	A$297.7 million	A$288.6 million
Consolidated Investment Fund	A$48.1 million	A$51.6 million	A$42.6 million	A$43.5 million

== Structure of the Fund ==
The binary structure consists of an endowment fund (the 'A Account') and a revolving fund or buffer account (the 'B Account'). The operation of the Tuvalu Trust Fund is directed to ensuring that the capital of the Fund in the 'A Account' is maintained in real terms, taking account of the effect of inflation (the 'maintained value'). Distributions from the 'A Account' are not always available. The Advisory Committee calculates the maintained value of the funds in the 'A Account' at 30 September of each year based on the Australian consumer price index. If the market value of the funds in the 'A Account' is greater than the maintained value, then the difference is placed in the 'B Account' or “Consolidated Investment Fund” (CIF).

The operation of the Fund through two accounts assists in stabilizing the long-term financial situation of the Government of Tuvalu as well as addressing short-term budget needs. The funds held in the 'B Account' serve as a buffer against the volatility of the 'A Account' returns; i.e., during years when there are no returns or low returns. The funds in the 'B Account' can be accessed by the Tuvalu Government, which refers to the funds in the 'B Account' in the Budget as the Consolidated Investment Fund (CIF), which can be drawn down into the consolidated revenue account as an additional source of revenue for expenditure on government services through the recurrent budget. There is no specific language in the agreement that established the Tuvalu Trust Fund as to the minimum balance of the 'B Account'. There has been a debate about how much of a buffer is sufficient. The board of the fund have settled on a target CIF balance of 16 percent of the maintained value of the fund.

The Tuvalu Trust Fund was established with a management structure that was designed to avoid the mismanagement and corruption that has plagued many other Pacific trust funds. One important element of the Tuvalu Trust Fund is that it is structured to avoid overdrawing to fund unauthorised projects. This is achieved through the separation of fund capital from fund proceeds available for distribution. The success of the Tuvalu Trust Fund is attributed by Brian Bell, a member of the Tuvalu Trust Fund Advisory Committee from its inception in 1987 to 2002, to the following factors: accountability through a Board of four directors with Tuvalu in the chair and the other original parties providing members; the use of professional funds management to provide investment advice; the monitoring of the performance of the fund by actuarial consultants (the Fund Monitor); the auditing of the fund by international auditors; and an advisory committee to monitor Tuvalu's economic performance and provide advice to the Government and the Board.

== Contribution to the Tuvaluan budget ==
The Tuvalu Trust Fund was established to supplement the national budget, underpin economic development, and help the nation achieve greater financial autonomy. An undertaking of the Government of Tuvalu is that it will "treat all moneys received by it from the Fund as public moneys of Tuvalu and as such subject to Parliamentary appropriation and scrutiny."

The Tuvalu Trust Fund has contributed roughly 15% of the annual government budget each year since 1990. With a capital value of about 2.5 times GDP, the Trust Fund provides an important buffer for Tuvalu's volatile income sources from fishing and royalties from the revenue from licensing of the .tv domain name.

In the thirty years from 1987 to 2017, the Government of Tuvalu has received distributions of AUD$100 million in absolute terms or AUD$154 million in 2017 values.

== Falekaupule Trust Fund (FTF) ==
The success of the Tuvalu Trust Fund was followed by the establishment of the Falekaupule Trust Fund (FTF), which is a trust fund for outer island development. The Asian Development Bank (ADB) provided A$6 million in loan funds, with the FTF being established in July 1999 and the funds being invested in February 2000. The Tuvalu Government agreed to match the amount provided by the ADB, with contributions from each of the eight island communities of Tuvalu, and with the island contributions also matched by the Government. The governance structure of the FTF follows that of the Tuvalu Trust Fund, but with each island community having a representative on the board and the government providing a non-voting chair.

In 2001 the value of the FTF was around AUD$15 million of which AUD$1.2 million was contributed by the island communities. A reserve account for the FTF was established in 2005, which has same purpose as the CIF, in that it is intended to smooth out the stream of revenue from the investments made through the FTF. At 30 June 2007, the market value of the FTF had increased to AUD$25.3 million and the FTF's Reserve Account was AUD$1.4 million.

The 2008 financial crisis affected the FTF, which is required to maintain its value in real terms before a distribution can be made. At 30 September 2010, the maintained value was AUD$27.3 million; the result of capital growth and contributions from development partners. This is some AUD$3.5 million higher than the market value of AUD$23.8 million. The gap of 15% between the market value and the maintained value must be recouped before another distribution can be made. Since the commencement of FTF there have been four years in which distributions were made. The FTF has distributed AUD$6.4 million with some AUD$5.3 million allocated to island development (the balance of AUD$1.1 million is held in reserve by the communities). This equates to an average of AUD$55,000 spent per island per year.

== Tuvalu Survival Fund (TSF) ==
The Tuvaluan government established the Tuvalu Survival Fund (TSF) in 2016 to finance climate change programs and as a fund available to respond promptly to natural disasters, such as tropical cyclones. The TSF is deposited at the National Bank of Tuvalu. Contributions are made to the TSF from the national budget (10 percent of GDP in 2016, although no contribution was made in 2017 due to a fiscal deficit). The governance structure and investment procedures of the TSF were established in 2017. The Tuvaluan government allocated T$2 million to the TSF in the 2017 National Budget. At the end on 2020 the balance held by the fund was A$5 million.

== See also ==
- Economy of Tuvalu
- Foreign relations of Tuvalu
- Nauru Phosphate Royalties Trust
