= HMTSS Te Mataili II =

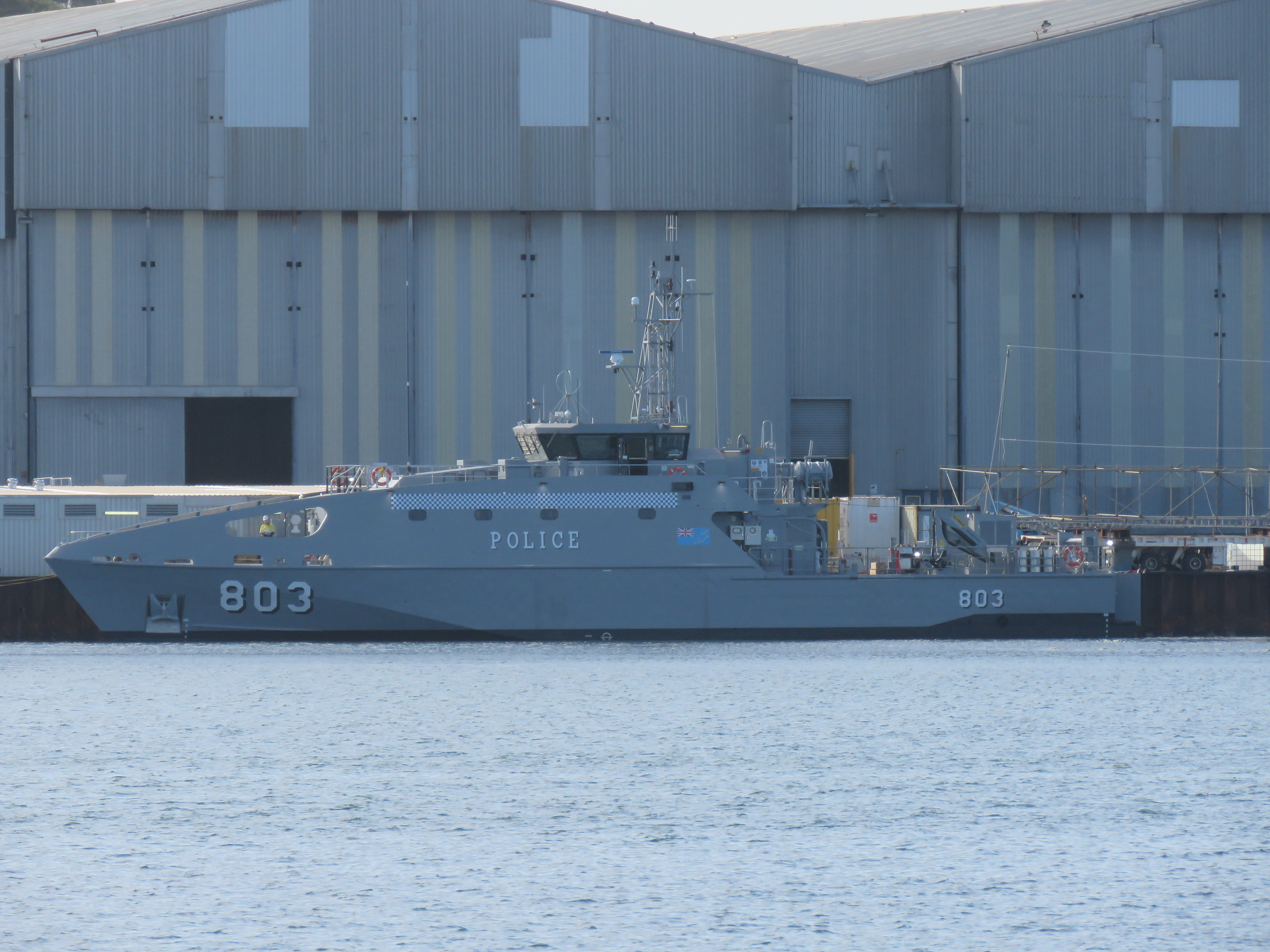
- Te Mataili III, replacement of Te Mataili II, at the Austal shipyards in Henderson, Western Australia

History

Tuvalu
- Name: Te Mataili II
- Builder: Austal
- Launched: 26 November 2018
- Commissioned: 5 April 2019
- Decommissioned: 2026
- Identification: IMO number: 4734116; MMSI number: 572211301; Callsign: T2SB
- Fate: Decommissioned and scrapped

General characteristics
- Class & type: Guardian-class patrol boat
- Length: 39.5 m (129 ft 7 in)
- Beam: 8 m (26 ft 3 in)
- Draft: 0.76 m (2.5 ft)
- Propulsion: 2 × Caterpillar 3516C diesel engines, 2 shafts
- Speed: 20 knots (37 km/h; 23 mph)
- Range: 3,000 nmi (5,600 km; 3,500 mi) at 12 knots (22 km/h; 14 mph)
- Armament: Australia provides the ships without armament, but they are designed to be able to mount heavy machine guns, or an autocannon of up to 30 mm on the foredeck

HMTSS Te Mataili II (802) is the second Guardian-class patrol boat completed, and the first to be given to the small Pacific Ocean nation Tuvalu. She was commissioned on 5 April 2019, replacing Te Mataili, a Pacific Forum patrol vessel, that had reached the end of her designed lifetime.

== Background ==
Following the United Nations Convention on the Law of the Sea extension of maritime nations' exclusive economic zones (EEZs) to 200 kilometres (108 nmi), Australia agreed to provide twelve of its neighbours with 22 Pacific Forum-class patrol vessels, so they could exercise sovereignty over their territory, including their extended EEZs, using their own resources. The first vessel was delivered in 1987, and in 2015 Australia announced plans to replace the original patrol boats with larger and more capable vessels.

== Design ==
Australian ship builder Austal won the $335 million Australian dollar contract for the project, and built the vessels at its Henderson shipyard, near Perth. Guardian-class vessels were designed to use commercial off-the-shelf components, not cutting edge, military grade equipment, to make them easier to maintain in small isolated shipyards.

The vessels are 39.5 metres (129 ft 7 in) long, can travel 3,000 nautical miles (5,600 km; 3,500 mi) at 12 knots (22 km/h; 14 mph). Their maximum speed is 20 knots (37 km/h; 23 mph). Their design allows the recipient nations to mount a pair of heavy machine guns, on either flank, and possibly an autocannon of up to 30 mm (1.2 in), on the foredeck.

== Operational career ==
In July 2019, Inspector Seleganui Fusi, commanding officer of Te Mataili II, hosted a delegation from Timor, letting them prepare for the arrival of their patrol vessels.

Te Mataili II was severely damaged by a cyclone in Vanuatu in March 2023 and was sent to Australia for repairs. Te Mataili II was declared beyond economic repair and was replaced by Te Mataili III. On 16 October 2024 Australia handed over a Guardian-class patrol boat to Tuvalu, which was named HMTSS ''Te Mataili III''.
