= Renewable energy in Tuvalu =

Renewable energy in Tuvalu is a growing sector of the country's energy supply. Tuvalu has committed to sourcing 100% of its electricity from renewable energy. This is considered possible because of the small size of the population of Tuvalu and its abundant solar energy resources due to its tropical location. It is somewhat complicated because Tuvalu consists of nine inhabited islands. The Tuvalu National Energy Policy (TNEP) was formulated in 2009, and the Energy Strategic Action Plan defines and directs current and future energy developments so that Tuvalu can achieve the ambitious target of 100% renewable energy for power generation by 2020. The program is expected to cost 20 million US dollars and is supported by the e8, a group of 10 electric companies from G8 countries. The Government of Tuvalu worked with the e8 group to develop the Tuvalu Solar Power Project, which is a 40 kW grid-connected solar system that is intended to provide about 5% of Funafuti's peak demand, and 3% of the Tuvalu Electricity Corporation's annual household consumption.

Tuvalu participates in the Alliance of Small Island States (AOSIS), which is a coalition of small island and low-lying coastal countries that have concerns about their vulnerability to the adverse effects of climate change. Under the Majuro Declaration, which was signed on 5 September 2013, Tuvalu has committed to implement power generation of 100% renewable energy (between 2013 and 2020), which is proposed to be implemented using Solar PV (95% of demand) and biodiesel (5% of demand). The feasibility of wind power generation will be considered. In November 2015 Tuvalu committed to reduction of emissions of greenhouse gases from the electricity generation (power) sector to almost zero emissions by 2025.

In November 2019, the Asian Development Bank (ADB) approved a US$6 million grant to the Government of Tuvalu to fund the production of electricity from renewable energy sources from 15% to 32% in Funafuti and from around 70% to over 90% in Tuvalu's outer islands. Funafuti will receive rooftop solar photovoltaic and battery energy storage systems and the outer islands of Nukufetau, Nukulaelae, and Nui will receive climate-resilient, ground-mounted solar photovoltaic systems. When the project is complete, 35% of electricity generation during daylight hours will be from renewable energy sources.

== Tuvalu's carbon footprint ==
Tuvalu's power has come from electricity generation facilities that use imported diesel brought in by ships. The Tuvalu Electricity Corporation (TEC) on the main island of Funafuti operates the large power station (2000 kW).

Funafuti's power station comprises three 750 kVA diesel generators with 11 kV operating voltage, which were installed in 2007. Total power output is 1,800 kW. The old generators have remained offline (1920 kW) but are available as back-up to the main system. The cost of diesel is subsidised by approximately 40% of the annual fuel consumption through the Japan Non Project Grant Assistance (NPGA), although this subsidy may end, which will expose the true cost of diesel generation of electricity.

The installed PV capacity in Funafuti in 2020 was 735 kW compared to 1800 kW of diesel (16% penetration).

Seven of the eight outer islands are powered by 48 - 80 kW each diesel generators with a total generating capacity per island averaging 176 kW, although Vaitupu generates 208 kW and Nukulaelae generates 144 kW. Niulakita operates individual DC home solar systems. In the other islands the diesel generators have been run for 12–18 hours per day. For the small power stations on the outlying islands, fuel has to be transferred to 200 litres (44 imp gal; 53 US gal) barrels and offloaded from the ships. A small project to power the inter-island telecommunications systems by photovoltaics began in 1979 but was mismanaged.

A project installed hundreds of small household solar systems as well as solar powered medical refrigerators beginning in the early 1980s but poor training and management led to installation and maintenance problems. The ADB project funding announced in November 2019 will increase production of electricity from renewable energy sources from 15% to 32% in Funafuti and from around 70% to over 90% in Tuvalu's outer islands. The ABD funding will also strengthen the institutional capacity of Tuvalu Electricity Corporation (TEC) by training staff in renewable energy project development and implementation.

Tuvalu, barely above sea level at any point, is concerned over global warming and sea level rise and sees its use of renewable energy as a moral example for others whose influence is greater. Kausea Natano, Tuvalu's minister for public utilities and industries in the Telavi Ministry stated this as "We thank those who are helping Tuvalu reduce its carbon footprint as it will strengthen our voice in upcoming international negotiations. And we look forward to the day when our nation offers an example to all -- powered entirely by natural resources such as the sun and the wind."

== Tuvalu Energy Sector Development Project (ESDP) ==
In 2014, the Tuvalu Electricity Corporation (TEC) began implementing a Master Plan for Renewable Energy and Energy Efficiency (MPREEE) through the Tuvalu Energy Sector Development Project (ESDP), which builds on the Tuvalu National Energy Policy, 2009. In November the funding to implement the MPREEE was boosted by a grant of US$6 million from the ADB, with the Government of Tuvalu contributing US$480,000 to the project.

== Commitment under the Majuro Declaration 2013 ==
The Sopoaga Ministry led by Enele Sopoaga made a commitment under the Majuro Declaration, which was signed on 5 September 2013, to implement power generation of 100% renewable energy (between 2013 and 2020). This commitment is proposed to be implemented using Solar PV (95% of demand) and biodiesel (5% of demand). The feasibility of wind power generation will be considered.

== Commitment under the United Nations Framework Convention on Climate Change (UNFCCC) 1994 ==
On 27 November 2015, the Government of Tuvalu announced its intended nationally determined contributions (NDCs) in relation to the reduction of greenhouse gases (GHGs) under provisions of the United Nations Framework Convention on Climate Change (UNFCCC), which became effective on 21 March 1994:

Tuvalu commits to reduction of emissions of greenhouse gases from the electricity generation (power) sector, by 100%, ie almost zero emissions by 2025.

Tuvalu's indicative quantified economy-wide target for a reduction in total emissions of GHGs from the entire energy sector to 60% below 2010 levels by 2025.

These emissions will be further reduced from the other key sectors, agriculture and waste, conditional upon the necessary technology and finance.

These targets go beyond the targets enunciated in Tuvalu's National Energy Policy (NEP) and the Majuro Declaration on Climate Leadership (2013). Currently, 50% of electricity is derived from renewables, mainly solar, and this figure will rise to 75% by 2020 and 100% by 2025. This would mean almost zero use of fossil fuel for power generation. This is also in line with our ambition to keep the warming to less than 1.5°C, if there is a chance to save atoll nations like Tuvalu.

== Solar energy ==
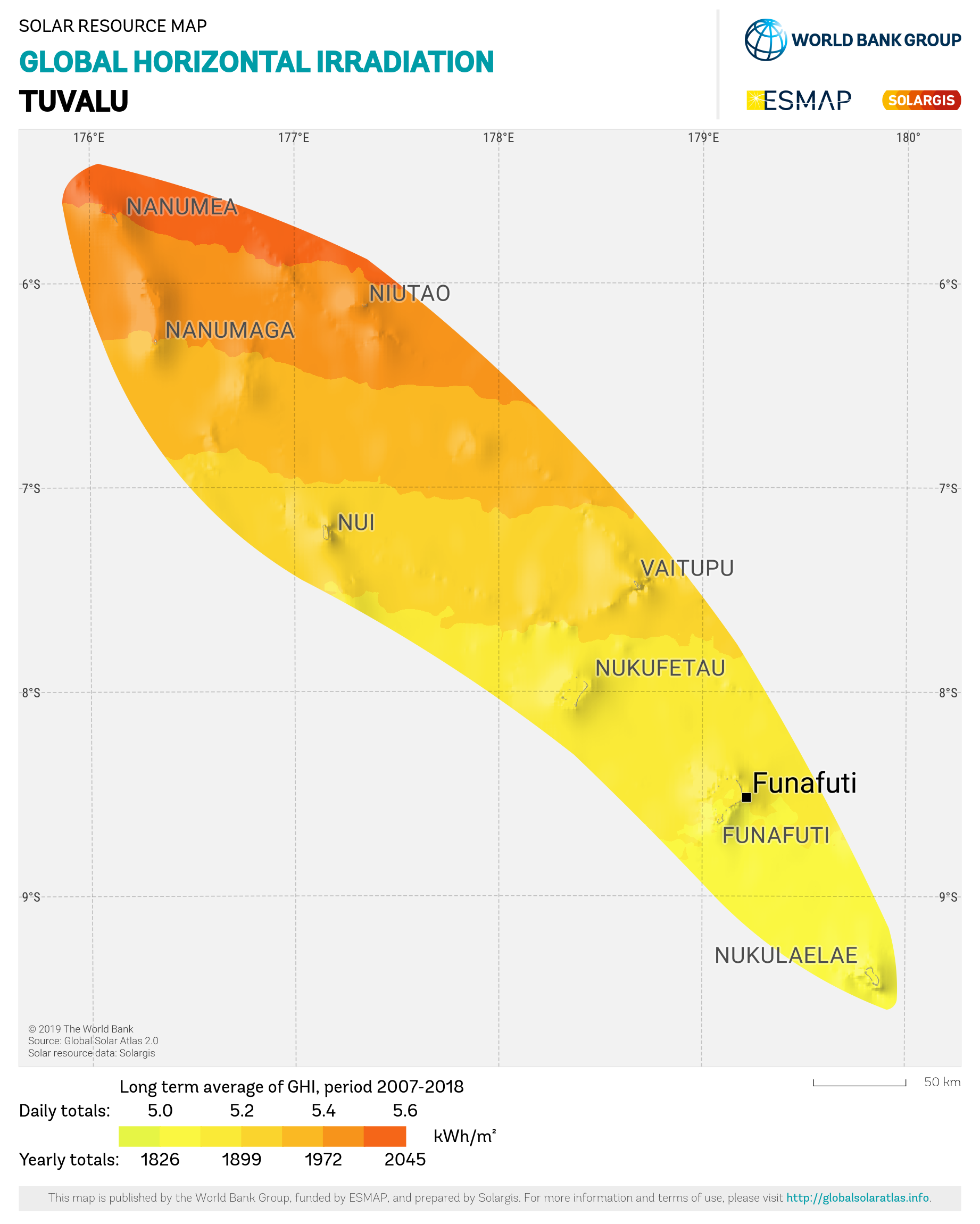
Solar potential of Tuvalu

In 2007, Tuvalu was getting 2% of its energy from solar, through 400 small systems managed by the Tuvalu Solar Electric Co-operative Society. These were installed beginning in 1984 and, in the late 1990s, 34% of families in the outer islands had a PV system (which generally powered 1-3 lights and perhaps a few hours a day of radio use). Each of the eight islands had a medical center with a PV-powered vaccine refrigerator and each island's solar technician had a larger PV system which ran a household refrigerator. Followup on the installations showed no deterioration of the PV panels but switches and light fixtures had suffered damage or failed from the salt air.

The implementation of the Tuvalu Solar Power Project in 2008–9 involved the installation of a 40 kW grid-connected solar system that is intended to provide about 5% of Funafuti's peak demand, and 3% of TEC's annual household consumption. The first large scale system in Tuvalu was a 40 kW solar panel installation on the roof of Tuvalu Sports Ground. This grid-connected 40 kW solar system was established in 2008 by the E8 and Japan Government through Kansai Electric Company (Japan) and contributes 1% of electricity production on Funafuti. Future plans include expanding this plant to 60 kW.

A 46 kW solar installation with battery storage at the Motufoua Secondary School on Vaitupu island was brought online on 27 November 2009. At the date of installation it was described as the largest diesel-solar photovoltaic (PV) hybrid electricity system in the South Pacific. Prior to the installment of the system the residential school relied upon a diesel powered generator, which needed to be turned off during the night. The hybrid system saves thousands of dollars in diesel costs and provides the school with a 24-hour supply of energy, with up to 200 kWh per day.

Funding for further PV solar system grid-tied systems was announced in late 2011 for Funafuti, with the funding provided by the Pacific Environment Community (PEC) Fund. In 2015 a New Zealand aid programme resulted in Solarcity and Infratec Renewables, two New Zealand companies, installing photovoltaic panels on government buildings on Funafuti. These PV panels are expected to generate 170 kW of electricity and are estimated to deliver 5 percent of the energy requirements for Funafuti and will reduce Tuvalu's dependence on diesel by up to 62,000 litres. In 2020 the installed PV capacity in Funafuti was 735 kW compared to 1800 kW of diesel (16% penetration).

A non-profit, Alofa Tuvalu, is promoting solar water heating and solar ovens as well as investigating producing biogas, biodiesel and ethanol.

In January 2014, Tuvalu signed an agreement with MASDAR, a UAE Government company, which will provided US$3 million in aid to help Tuvalu solarize the outer islands, to reduce reliance on fossil fuel for electricity generation.

In 2014 New Zealand and the European Union agreed to provide finance to the Government of Tuvalu to install battery-backed solar photovoltaic (PV) systems on the outer islands. The 191kWp project will provide the islands with 24 hours-a-day electricity and allow Tuvalu to save up to 120,000 litres of diesel per year, which will amount to a reduction in spending on diesel of about AU$200,000 per year. This project will result in the construction of four small scale solar-hybrid systems that are to be located on Vaitupu, Nanumanga, Nanumea and Niutao. From January to March 2015 Powersmart, a New Zealand company, implemented German solar power technology to build the new Vaitupu powerhouse; with the next solar-hybrid system being built on Nanumaga in September. The 2015 installation program continued with Nanumea in October and Niutao in November.

The 2019 ABD funding for renewable energy development and implementation in intended to result in 35% of the electricity delivered to the people of Tuvalu during daylight hours being generated by solar photovoltaic (PV) systems.

In January 2020, Infratec commissioned a 73.5 kW rooftop solar panel-battery storage project on the Tuvalu Fisheries Department building in Funafuti, funded by the New Zealand Ministry of Foreign Affairs and Trade.

== Wind energy ==
Wind power is also mentioned as a future electricity source. Tuvalu's commitment, as part of the Majuro Declaration, is to implement power generation of 100% renewable energy (between 2013 and 2020). The feasibility of wind power generation will be considered as part of this commitment.

== Filmography ==
- Soccer stands solar installation, (2012) video by Kansai Electric Power Company, the project developer
- Tuvalu: Renewable Energy in the Pacific Islands Series documentary film (2012) Global Environment Facility (GEF), United Nations Development Programme (UNDP) and SPREP
