= 2011 Tuvalu drought =

Natural disaster in Tuvalu

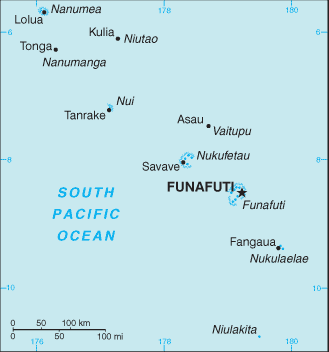
Map of Tuvalu

The 2011 Tuvalu drought was a period of severe drought afflicting Tuvalu, a South Pacific island country of approximately 10,500 people, in the latter half of 2011. A state of emergency was declared on September 28, 2011; with rationing of available fresh-water. The La Niña event that caused the drought ended in April–May 2012. By August 2012 the El Niño-Southern Oscillation (ENSO) Conditions indicated that the tropical Pacific Ocean was on the brink of an El Niño event.

== Background ==
Tuvalu experiences the effects of El Niño & La Niña that flow from changes in ocean temperatures in equatorial and central Pacific. El Niño effects increase the chances of tropical cyclones; while La Niña effects increase the chances of drought conditions in Tuvalu.

Tuvalu relies primarily on rainfall for the majority of its drinking water, which is collected and stored in storage tanks. The country normally receives between 200–400 mm (7.87–15.75 in) of rain per month during an average year.

== La Niña effect and drought ==
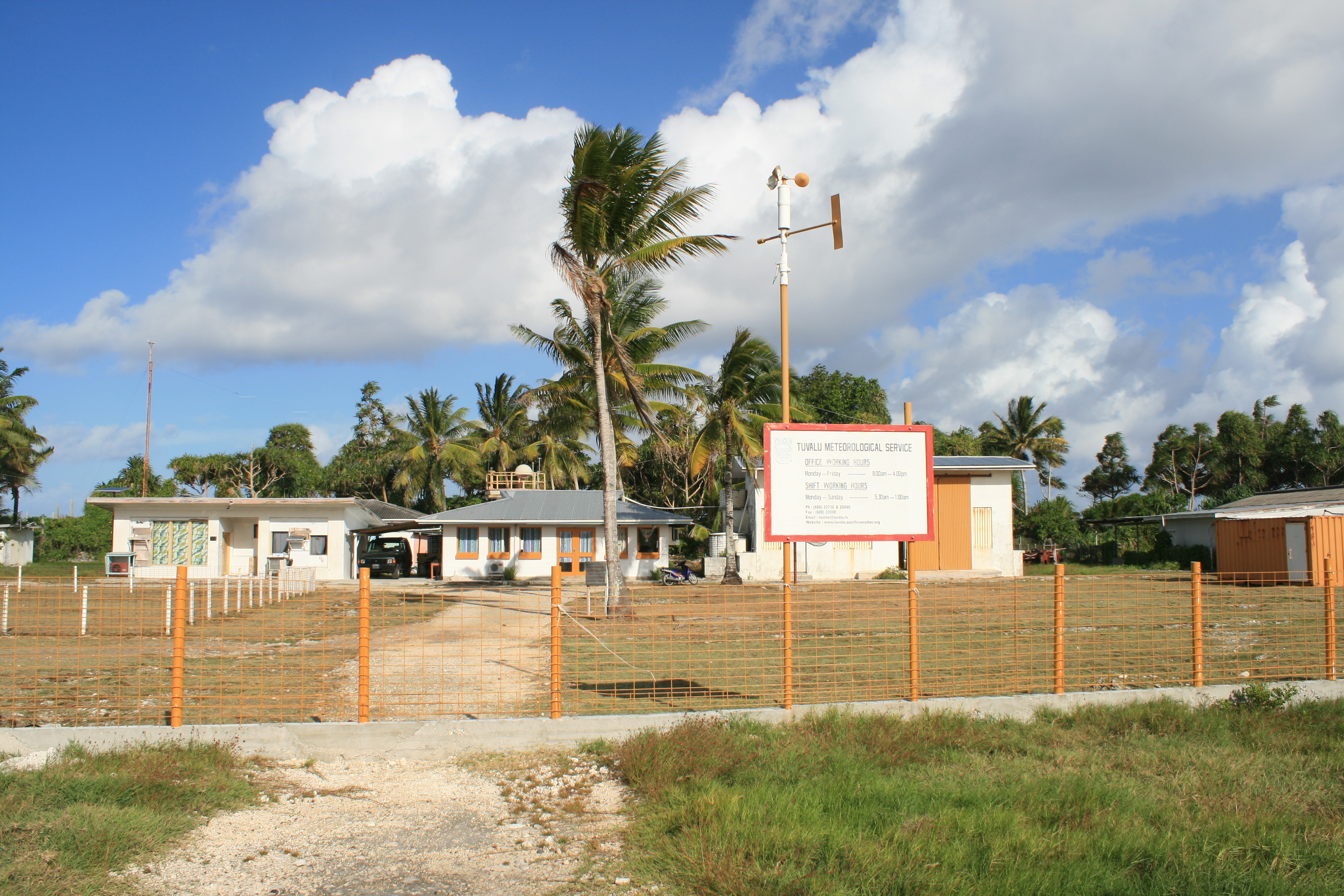
Tuvalu Meteorological Service, Fongafale, Funafuti atoll

The country had been hit by a prolonged period of dry weather in the second half 2011, which had been attributed to the La Niña that results in the cooling of the surface temperature of the sea around Tuvalu which resulted in reduced rainfall. In October 2011, the Tuvalu Red Cross reported that the country had not received normal rainfall in six months, leading to shortages. The capital, Funafuti, and several of the outer atolls had been particularly affected by the drought. Nukulaelae and Nanumaga were the most seriously affected outer islands. The dry conditions on Nukulaelae affected the vast majority of pulaka pits - Pulaka, or swamp taro, is a staple crop for Tuvaluans. On Vaitupu the drought was also severe, but not as bad as the other islands.

== Declaration of a state of emergency ==
The government declared a state of emergency on September 28, 2011, due to severe water shortages in the capital atoll, Funafuti. The drought conditions resulted in water being rationed on the islands of Funafuti and Nukulaelae as water reserves ran low. Households on Funafuti and Nukulaelae were restricted to two buckets of fresh water per day (40 litres).

Households on Funafuti and Nukulaelae were rationed to two buckets of fresh-water a day (40 litres). A resident of Funafuti (in a household of 5 people) is quoted as saying that it is "hard, very hard" for her household to get by on the ration of two buckets of water a day. Meanwhile, other Tuvaluans were being forced to pay for imported foods as the consequence of failing crops as the result of the drought. Princess Margaret Hospital limited admissions to try and cope with the water rationing, with a fear that there may be a rise in waterborne diseases due to a lack of public bathing.

The secretary general of Tuvalu Red Cross, Tataua Pefe, said that lack of rain had caused the contamination of remaining ground water supplies, "It's not safe for consumption...Some animals have died recently and we think it's because of subterranean water."

Lack of rainfall had affected other countries and territories in the region, including American Samoa, Samoa, Tokelau and Tonga.

== International aid ==
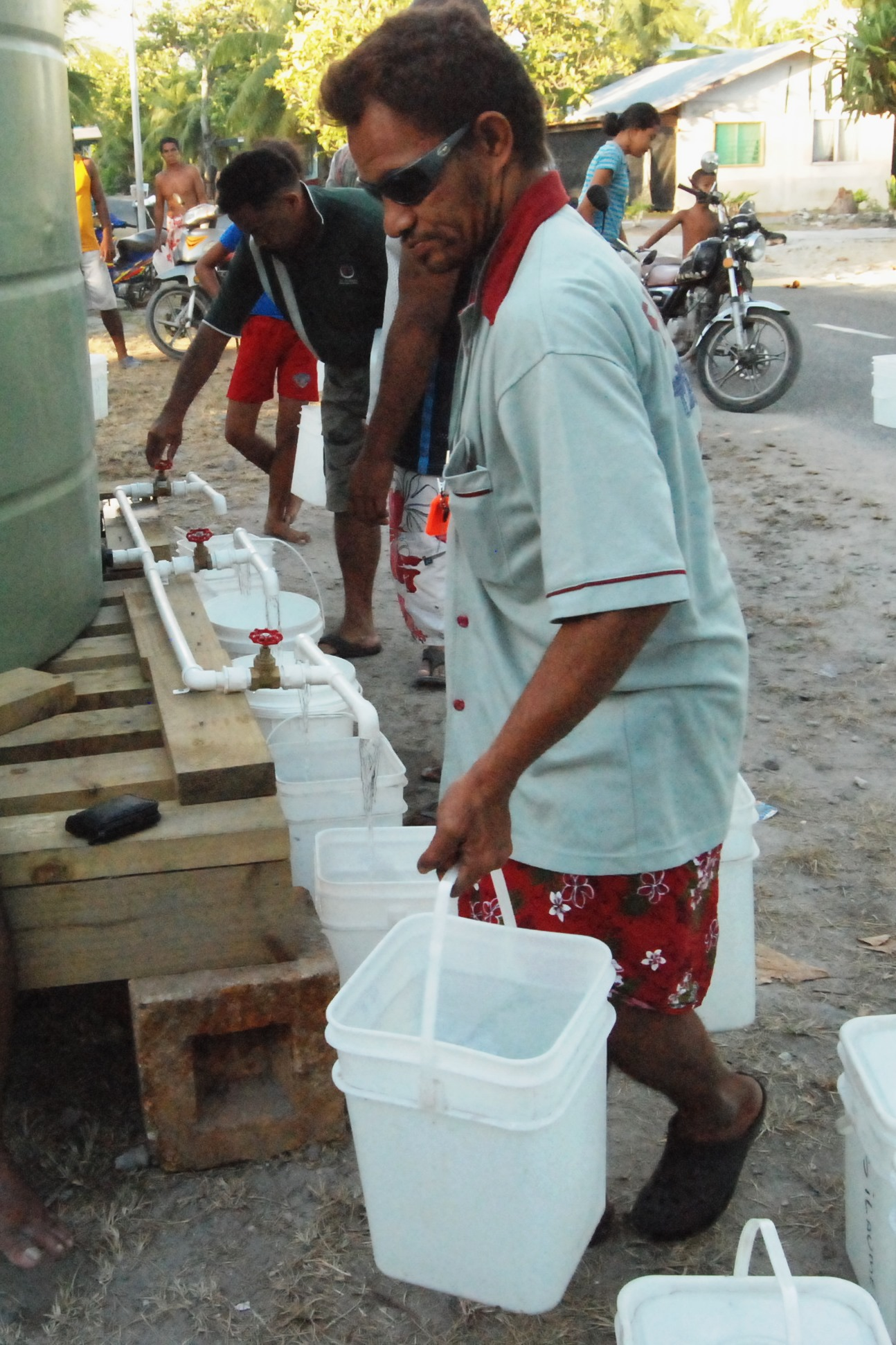
A public water collection point set up on Funafuti in response to the drought, Tuvalu, 2011 (Credit: DFAT)

New Zealand began airlifting supplies and fresh water to Tuvalu on Monday, October 3, 2011. The New Zealand government had received reports during the prior weekend that parts of Tuvalu had just a two-day supply of water left, according to Foreign Affairs Minister Murray McCully. A New Zealand Air Force C-130 Hercules transport plane landed in the country carrying two desalination units and large containers of fresh water into Funafuti. Australia also sent a desalination plant.

Officials from various aid agencies, including the International Red Cross and the Tuvalu Red Cross, worked with the New Zealand and Tuvaluan governments to alleviate the drought and shortages.

The government of South Korea funded the shipment of 60,000 bottles of water from Fiji to Tuvalu. The governments of Australia and New Zealand responded to the fresh-water crisis by supplying temporary desalination plants, and assisting in the repair of the existing desalination unit that was donated by Japan in 2006.

In response to the 2011 drought, Japan funded the purchase of a 100 m^{3}/d desalination plant and two portable 10 m^{3}/d plants as part of its Pacific Environment Community (PEC) program. Tuvalu had previously purchased a desalination plant from Japan during the 1999 drought.

Aid programmes of the European Union in 2010 and 2011; and Australia also provided water storage tanks to increase storage capacity in the outer islands as part of a longer term solution for the storage of available fresh water. Australia has also funded the installation of water tanks on Funafuti, which project also involved improving roof and gutter systems of households to capture more fresh water. In July 2012 a United Nations Special Rapporteur called on the Tuvalu Government to develop a national water strategy to improve access to safe drinking water and sanitation.

== See also ==
- Climate change in Tuvalu
