= Tuvalu and the United Nations =

Tuvalu

United Nations membership
- Membership: Full member
- Since: September 5, 2000
- UNSC seat: Non-permanent (never elected)
- Ambassador: Dr. Tapugao Falefou

Tuvalu became the 189th member of the United Nations on September 5, 2000. Tuvalu is one of 14 states not recognising the People's Republic of China. The country has played a role in advocating for more ambitious international cooperation on mitigating climate change, given the country's vulnerability to its impacts.

== Overview ==
Tuvalu, one of the world's smallest countries, financed its membership with the revenue collected from its top-level domain .tv. Tuvalu has indicated that its priority within the United Nations is to emphasise "climate change and the unique vulnerabilities of Tuvalu to its adverse impacts". Other priorities are obtaining "additional development assistance from potential donor countries", widening the scope of Tuvalu's bilateral diplomatic relations, and, more generally, expressing "Tuvalu's interests and concerns". The issue of climate change has featured prominently in Tuvalu's interventions. Indeed, the country joined the United Nations as soon as it could afford to do so, to raise the issue to greater prominence. In June 2007, Prime Minister Apisai Ielemia wrote in the UN Chronicle that climate change was the "one issue that strikes at the heart of my nation", and added: "For this reason, Tuvalu has been very active in climate change negotiations and has actively participated in recent discussions in the UN Security Council. For a small island developing State like Tuvalu, this is a security issue of immense proportions". He called for "a new kind of Marshall Plan to secure the necessary funds to meet the costs of adaptation". Willy Telavi, who became Prime Minister in December 2010, has likewise asked the United Nations to act urgently on the issue.

Tuvalu notably played an active role in the 2009 United Nations Climate Change Conference in Copenhagen, attracting media attention. The Tuvaluan delegation submitted a proposed protocol which would have imposed deeper, legally binding emission cuts, including on developing nations. The proposal -dubbed by the media and by NGOs as the "Tuvalu Protocol"- was "immediately supported by other small island states, including Grenada, Trinidad and Tobago and several African states", but opposed by countries including China, India and Saudi Arabia. The disagreement caused a suspension in negotiations, and prompted supportive campaign groups to "demonstrate[...] outside the meeting in favour of Tuvalu, chanting: 'Tuvalu is the new deal.'" Tuvalu's position was supported by, among others, East Timor, the Dominican Republic, Jamaica and Vanuatu, and by Papua New Guinean chief negotiator Kevin Conrad. Tuvalu and its representative Ian Fry "were the toast of the thousands of environmentalists at the conference, who held a noisy demonstration in support of the island state's position". In an article entitled "You caused it, you fix it: Tuvalu takes off the gloves", the Sydney Morning Herald noted that, by asking for a protocol that would legally bind developing countries, Tuvalu had "cracked a diplomatic axiom that has prevailed since the UN climate convention came into being in 1992: rich countries caused global warming, and it was their responsibility to fix it". The Economic Times in India noted that the Tuvaluan proposal had " take[n] centre stage", holding up proceedings for two consecutives days until it was rejected due to opposition from larger nations. Australian Senator Christine Milne described Tuvalu as "the mouse that roared" at the Conference. Fry refused to support the final agreement reached by the Conference, describing it as "30 pieces of silver to betray our future and our people", after delivering a final plea in a speech with tears in his eyes, concluding "The fate of my country rests in your hands". The Australian's political editor commented that, following Fry's "tear-jerking performance that prompted wild applause among the crowded Copenhagen conference floor", Tuvalu was "no longer small fry on the world stage".

== Least developed country (LDC) status ==
The United Nations designates Tuvalu as a least developed country (LDC) because of its limited potential for economic development, absence of exploitable resources and its small size and vulnerability to external economic and environmental shocks. Tuvalu participates in the Enhanced Integrated Framework for Trade-Related Technical Assistance to Least Developed Countries (EIF), which was established in October 1997 under the auspices of the World Trade Organization. In 2013 Tuvalu deferred its graduation from least developed country (LDC) status to a Developing country to 2015. Prime Minister Enele Sopoaga said that this deferral was necessary to maintain access by Tuvalu to the funds provided by the United Nations's National Adaptation Programme of Action (NAPA), as "Once Tuvalu graduates to a developed country, it will not be considered for funding assistance for climate change adaptation programmes like NAPA, which only goes to LDCs". Tuvalu had met targets so that Tuvalu was to graduate from LDC status. Prime minister, Enele Sopoaga wants the United Nations to reconsider its criteria for graduation from LDC status as not enough weight is given to the environmental plight of small island states like Tuvalu in the application of the Environmental Vulnerability Index (EVI).

== Addresses to the United Nations ==
In 2002, Governor-General Tomasi Puapua concluded his address to the United Nations General Assembly by saying:

"Finally, Mr. President, efforts to ensure sustainable development, peace, security and longterm livelihood for the world will have no meaning to us in Tuvalu in the absence of serious actions to address the adverse and devastating effects of global warming. At no more than three meters above sea level, Tuvalu is particularly exposed to these effects. Indeed our people are already migrating to escape, and are already suffering from the consequences of what world authorities on climate change have consistently been warning us. Only two weeks ago, a period when the weather was normal and calm and at low tide, unusually big waves suddenly crashed ashore and flooded most part of the capital island.

In the event that the situation is not reversed, where does the international community think the Tuvalu people are to hide from the onslaught of sea level rise? Taking us as environmental refugees, is not what Tuvalu is after in the long run. We want the islands of Tuvalu and our nation to remain permanently and not be submerged as a result of greed and uncontrolled consumption of industrialized countries. We want our children to grow up the way my wife and I did in our own islands and in our own culture.

We once again appeal to the industrialized countries, particularly those who have not done so, to urgently ratify and fully implement the Kyoto Protocol, and to provide concrete support in all our adaptation efforts to cope with the effects of climate change and sea level rise. Tuvalu, having little or nothing to do with the causes, cannot be left on its own to pay the price. We must work together. May God Bless you all. May God Bless the United Nations."

In a speech on 16 September 2005 to the 60th Session of the UN General Assembly, Prime Minister Maatia Toafa emphasized the impact of climate change as a "broader security issue which relates to environmental security. Living in a very fragile island environment, our long-term security and sustainable development is closely linked to issues of climate change, preserving biodiversity, managing our limited forests and water resources."

Addressing the Special Session of the Security Council on Energy, Climate and Security in April 2007, Ambassador Pita stated:

"We face many threats associated with climate change. Ocean warming is changing the very nature of our island nation. Slowly our coral reefs are dying through coral bleaching, we are witnessing changes to fish stocks, and we face the increasing threat of more severe cyclones. With the highest point of four metres above sea level, the threat of severe cyclones is extremely disturbing, and severe water shortages will further threaten the livelihoods of people in many islands. Madam President, our livelihood is already threatened by sea level rise, and the implications for our long term security are very disturbing. Many have spoken about the possibility of migrating from our homeland. If this becomes a reality, then we are faced with an unprecedented threat to our nationhood. This would be an infringement on our fundamental rights to nationality and statehood as constituted under the Universal Declaration of Human Rights and other international conventions."

Addressing the United Nations General Assembly in September 2008, Prime Minister Apisai Ielemia stated:

"Climate change is, without doubt, the most serious threat to the global security and survival of mankind. It is an issue of enormous concern to a highly vulnerable small island State like Tuvalu. Here in this Great House, we now know both the science and economics of climate change. We also know the cause of climate change, and that human actions by ALL countries are urgently needed to address it. The central message of both the IPCC reports and the Sir Nicholas Stern reports to us, world leaders, is crystal clear: unless urgent actions are done to curb greenhoses gasses emissions by shifting to a new global energy mix based on renewable energy sources, and unless timely adaptation is done, the adverse impact of climate change on all communities, will be catastrophic." (italics in original submission)

On 29 September 2013 the Deputy Prime Minister Vete Sakaio concluded his speech to the General Debate of the 68th Session of the United Nations General Assembly with an appeal to the world, "please save Tuvalu against climate change. Save Tuvalu in order to save yourself, the world".

== Permanent Representative of Tuvalu to the United Nations ==
- Enele Sopoaga (3 July 2001 to 2006)
- Afelee F. Pita (19 December 2006 to December 2012)
- Aunese Simati (20 December 2012 to July 2017)
- Samuelu Laloniu (21 July 2017 to 19 January 2023)
- Dr. Tapugao Falefou is the current permanent representative to the United Nations. He took up his post as Tuvalu’s permanent representative on 13 February 2023. He later presented his credentials as Tuvalu's ambassador to the United States.

== See also ==
- United Nations Security Council Resolution 1290
