= List of diplomatic missions of Tuvalu =

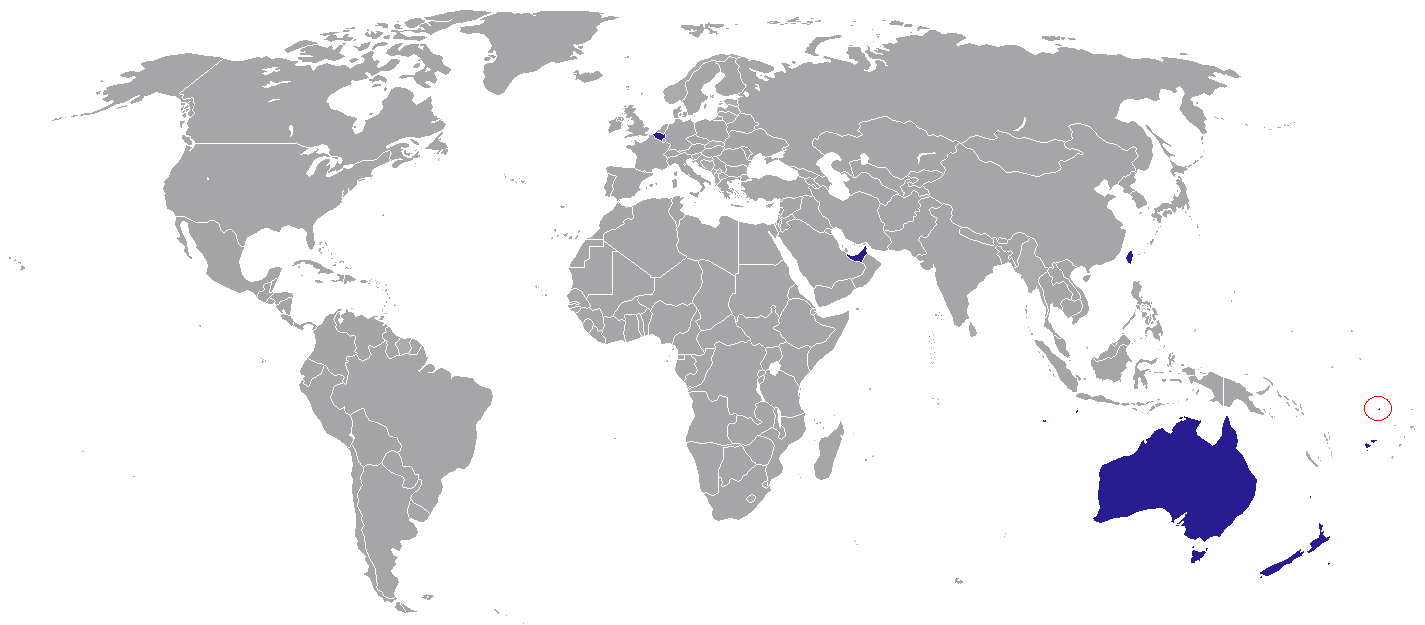
Diplomatic missions of Tuvalu

This is a list of diplomatic missions of Tuvalu. Tuvalu has a population of 12,100, making it the second least populated independent country in the world, ahead of the Vatican (900). It consequently cannot support anything but the barest diplomatic network.

== General Aspects ==
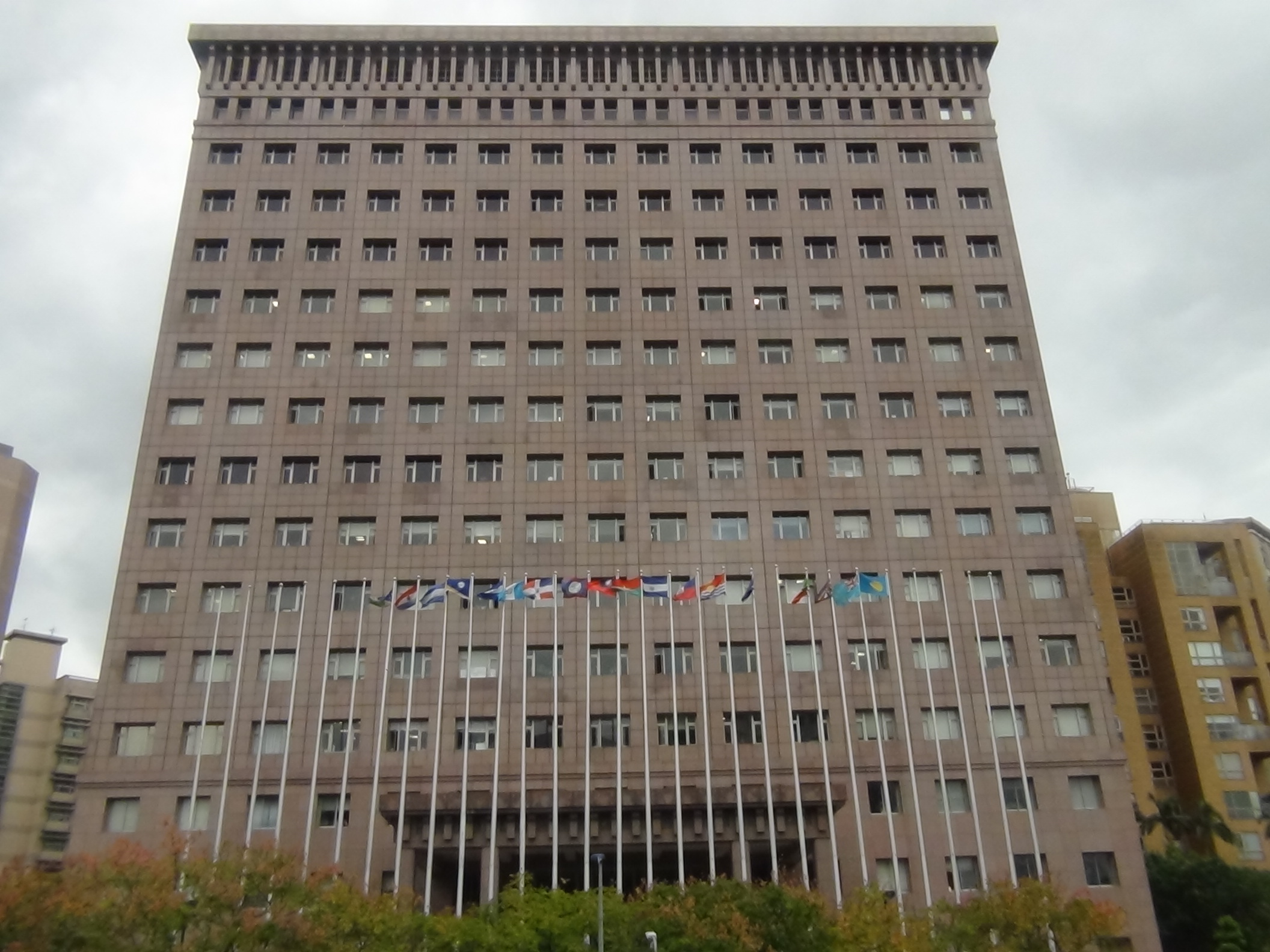
Building hosting the Embassy of Tuvalu in Taipei

Tuvalu has only six diplomatic missions abroad: a High Commission in Suva, Fiji, (opened in 1976), its office at the United Nations (opened in 2001), an embassy in the Republic of China (Taiwan) (opened in March 2013), a High Commission in Wellington, New Zealand (opened in February 2015), an embassy to the United Arab Emirates in Abu Dhabi (opened in April 2022). and a High Commission in Canberra, Australia (opened in May 2025).

Tuvalu established an embassy in Brussels, Belgium, home city of the European Union (EU) headquarters (opened in 2008), however, the embassy was closed in 2022, with Tuvalu's accreditation to the EU and Belgium managed from the embassy in Abu Dhabi.

Tuvalu also has honorary consulates in Sydney (Australia), Tokyo (Japan), Kaohsiung (Republic of China), Basel (Switzerland), Singapore, Hamburg (Germany), Seoul (South Korea) and in the Tuvalu House in London (United Kingdom).

== Asia ==
- Republic of China (Taiwan)
  - Taipei (Embassy)
- United Arab Emirates
  - Abu Dhabi (Embassy)

== Europe ==
- Belgium
  - Brussels (Embassy) (until 2022)

== Oceania ==
- Australia
  - Canberra (High Commission)
- Fiji
  - Suva (High Commission)
- New Zealand
  - Wellington (High Commission)

== Multilateral organisations ==
- United Nations
  - New York City (Permanent Mission) (Note: Also accredited to Guatemala.)

== Permanent Representative of Tuvalu to the United Nations ==
- Enele Sopoaga was Tuvalu's first permanent representative to the United Nations, taking up his post on 3 July 2001. to 2006)
- Afelee F. Pita took up his post on 19 December 2006. to December 2012)
- Aunese Simati took up his post on 20 December 2012. to July 2017)
- Samuelu Laloniu took up his post on 21 July 2017. He also presented his credentials as Tuvalu's ambassador to the United States on 21 July 2017.
- Dr. Tapugao Falefou took up his post on 13 February 2023. He later presented his credentials as Tuvalu's ambassador to the United States.

== See also ==
- Foreign relations of Tuvalu
- List of diplomatic missions in Tuvalu
- Visa policy of Tuvalu
