= Tuvalu–United States relations =

- Tuvalu: United States

Tuvalu–United States relations are bilateral relations between Tuvalu and the United States. The United States does not have a dedicated ambassador to Tuvalu. Instead, the U.S. ambassador to Fiji is also accredited to Tuvalu, handling diplomatic relations from Suva, Fiji.

Tuvalu maintains a diplomatic presence in the United States through its Permanent Mission to the United Nations, in New York City; it is headed by Tapugao Falefou, Tuvalu's Permanent Representative to the United Nations. Tuvalu's Permanent Representative to the United Nations also acts as Tuvalu's ambassador to the United States.

== History ==
There was limited interaction between U.S. citizens and the Tuvaluan people in the 19th century. American whaling ships were active in the waters of the Tuvaluan archipelago. In 1821 Captain George Barrett, of the Nantucket whaler Independence II, visited Niulakita, which he named Rocky (Group). This name was never much used, but Independence Island, after Barrett's ship, was one of the several names which came into general use for Niulakita during the 19th century.

The United States Exploring Expedition under Lieutenant Charles Wilkes visited Funafuti, Nukufetau and Vaitupu in 1841. During the visit of the expedition to Tuvalu Alfred Thomas Agate, engraver and illustrator, recorded the dress and tattoo patterns of men of Nukufetau.

On 15 April 1889 Niulakita was sold for $1,000 to Mr H. J. Moors, an American citizen living in Apia, Samoa. Niulakita and other islands of the Tuvaluan archipelago were claimed by the United States under the Guano Islands Act (1856), which was passed by the U.S. Congress to enable citizens of the U.S. to take possession of islands containing guano deposits. In the 1840s guano was a source of saltpeter for gunpowder as well as an agricultural fertilizer. The legislation was enacted to assist in securing supplies of guano.

On 4 August 1892 Captain Davis of HMS Royalist visited Niulakita but did not land on the island, he recorded in the ship's journal: “Several natives appeared on the beach, and hoisted up an American ensign.”

On 16 September 1896 Captain Gibson of HMS Curacoa, recorded in the ship's journal that six men and six women, natives of various islands, were living on Niulakita working for Moors. Captain Gibson determined that the island was not under American protection so he hoisted the Union Jack and delivered the flag, with a copy of the Declaration of British Protectorate, to the headman of the working party. Moors later abandoned Niulakita when the deposits of guano were depleted.

In 1900 USFC Albatross visited Funafuti when the United States Fish Commission were investigating the formation of coral reefs on Pacific atolls. Harry Clifford Fassett, captain's clerk and photographer, recorded people, communities and scenes at Funafuti.

During the Pacific War (World War 2), Funafuti was used as a base to prepare for the subsequent seaborn attacks on the Gilbert Islands (Kiribati) that were occupied by Japanese forces. The United States Marine Corps landed on Funafuti on 2 October 1942 and on Nanumea and Nukufetau in August 1943. The Japanese had already occupied Tarawa and other islands in what is now Kiribati, but were delayed by the losses at the Battle of the Coral Sea. The atolls of Tuvalu acted as a staging post during the preparation for the Battle of Tarawa and the Battle of Makin that commenced on 20 November 1943, which was the implementation of "Operation Galvanic".

Following Tuvalu becoming an independent nation in 1978, relations with the United States were confirmed by the signing of a Treaty of Friendship in 1979, which was ratified by the U.S. Senate in 1983, under which the United States renounced prior territorial claims to four Tuvaluan islands (Funafuti, Nukufetau, Nukulaelae and Niulakita) under the Guano Islands Act of 1856.

== Management of tuna fishing in the western Pacific ==
Tuvalu participates in the operations of the Pacific Islands Forum Fisheries Agency (FFA) and the Western and Central Pacific Fisheries Commission (WCPFC). The Tuvaluan government, the US government, and the governments of other Pacific islands, are parties to the South Pacific Tuna Treaty (SPTT), which entered into force in 1988. Tuvalu is also a member of the Nauru Agreement which addresses the management of tuna purse seine fishing in the tropical western Pacific. In May 2013 representatives from the United States and the Pacific Islands countries agreed to sign interim arrangement documents to extend the Multilateral Fisheries Treaty (which encompasses the South Pacific Tuna Treaty) to confirm access to the fisheries in the Western and Central Pacific for US tuna boats for 18 months. Tuvalu and the other members of the Pacific Islands Forum Fisheries Agency (FFA) and the United States have settled a tuna fishing deal for 2015; a longer-term deal will be negotiated. The treaty is an extension of the Nauru Agreement and provides for US flagged purse seine vessels to fish 8,300 days in the region in return for a payment of US$90 million made up by tuna fishing industry and US-Government contributions.

== Differences in positions on climate change ==
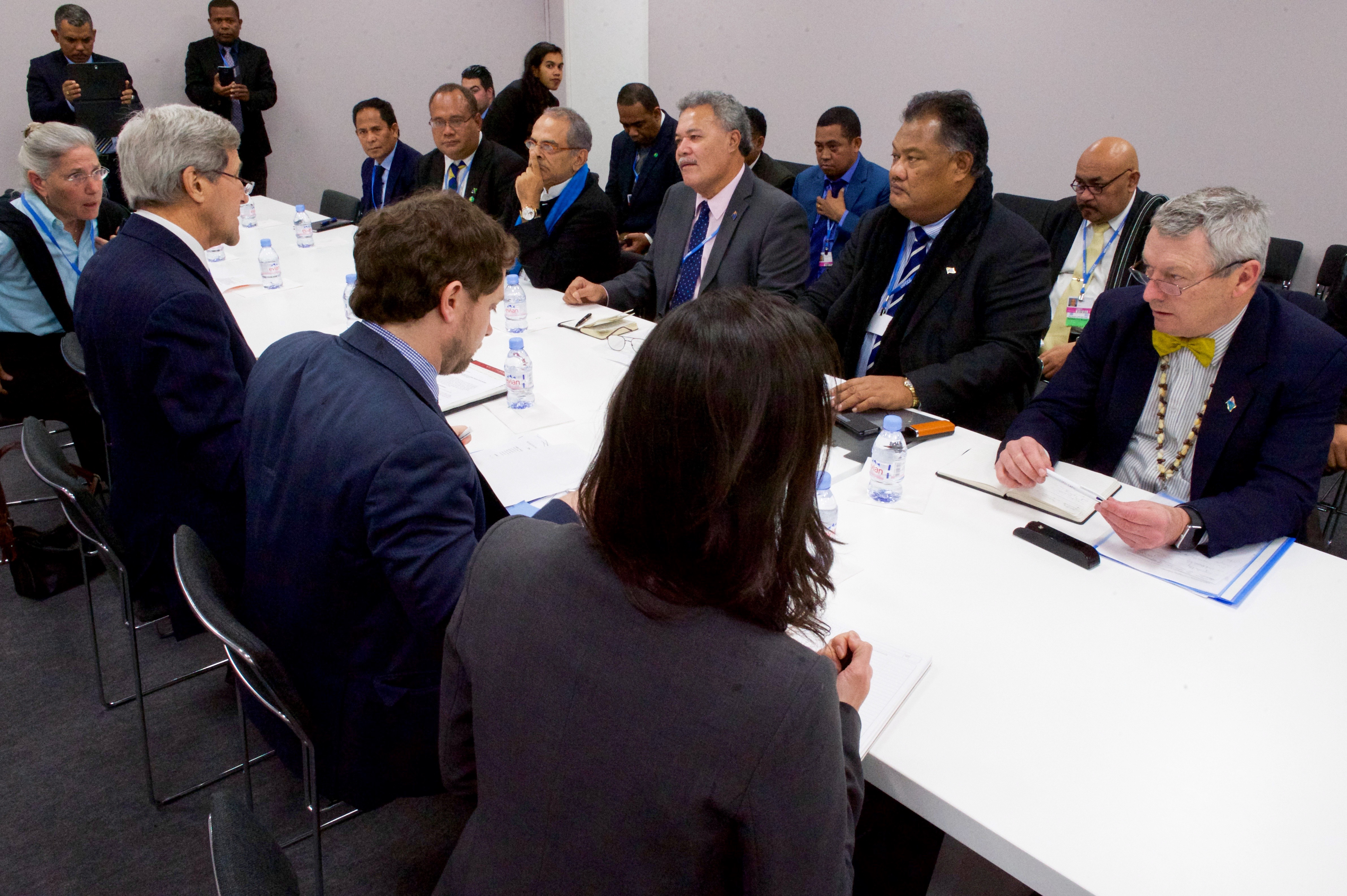
Secretary Kerry sits with Tuvaluan Prime Minister Sopoaga before their meeting at COP21 in Paris (2015)

There have been disagreements between the two countries over the issues of climate change and the Kyoto Protocol. The main point of friction between Tuvalu and the United States was the latter's non-ratification of the Kyoto Protocol.

The impact of global warming in Tuvalu has been a concern of the government of Tuvalu. Following the Kyoto Protocol, Tuvalu repeatedly urged the United States to do more to reduce its pollution levels. In 2002, Tuvaluan Prime Minister Koloa Talake threatened to take the United States to the International Court of Justice for its refusal to ratify the Kyoto Protocol. He was prevented from doing so by his subsequent defeat in that year's general election.

More recently, under the administration of President Barack Obama, the United States acknowledged the effects of climate change on the Pacific Small Island Developing States (PSIDS). Prime Minister Enele Sopoaga said at the 2015 United Nations Climate Change Conference (COP21 in December 2015) that the goal for COP21 should a global temperature goal of below 1.5 degrees Celsius relative to pre-industrial levels, which is the position of the Alliance of Small Island States.

The leadership of President Obama in achieving the outcome of COP21, resulted in the participating countries agreeing to reduce their carbon output "as soon as possible" and to do their best to keep global warming "to well below 2 degrees C", results in a closer alignment in the climate change policies of the two countries. Prime Minister Enele Sopoaga described the important outcomes of COP21 as including the stand-alone provision for assistance to small island states and some of the least developed countries for loss and damage resulting from climate change and the ambition of limiting temperature rise to 1.5 degrees by the end of the century.

== Consistent position on human rights practices ==
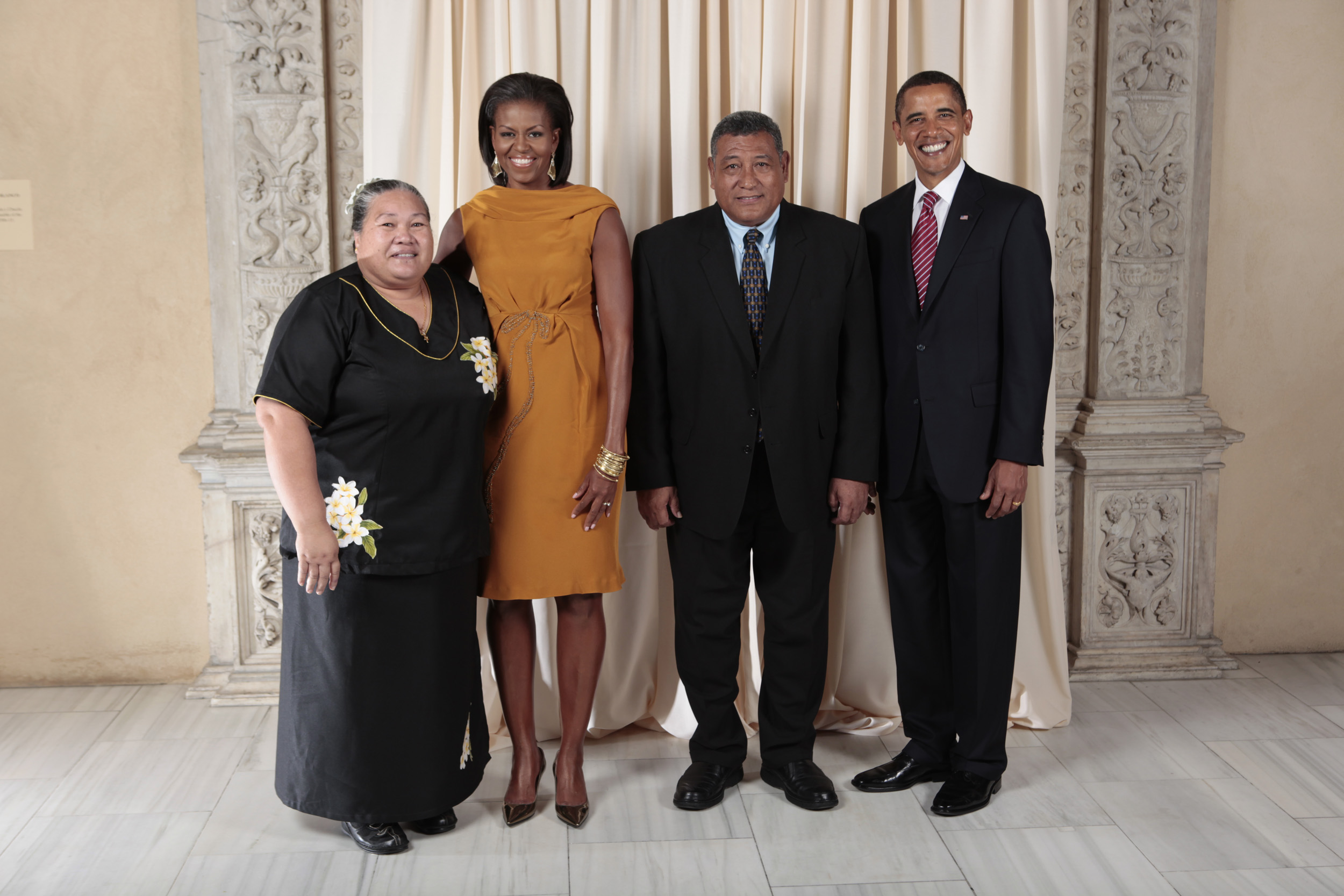
Prime Minister Apisai Ielemia and Sikinala Ielemia with President Barack Obama and First Lady Michelle Obama (2009)

Tuvalu supports American positions on issues related to human rights. Tuvalu participates in the preparation of reports prepared by the U.S. Department of State entitled "Country Reports on Human Rights Practices", which are submitted to the U.S. Congress by the Department of State in compliance with the Foreign Assistance Act of 1961 (FAA) and section 504 of the Trade Act of 1974.

Tuvalu is recognised as one of the Small Island Developing States (SIDS) and participates in the activities of the Alliance of Small Island States (AOSIS) and from this perspective Tuvalu lobbies to achieve development goals that in international forums may be opposed by the United States. There are many aspects of social and political policy on which Tuvalu maintains a position that is consistent with that of the United States. On 29 September 2013 the Deputy Prime Minister Vete Sakaio stated in his speech to the General Debate of the 68th Session of the United Nations General Assembly, that Tuvalu, maintains a commitment to “multilateralism and genuine collective action to reflect, assess, address and plan ahead our Chartered principles of peace, justice, human rights and social progress, and equal opportunity for all.”

== Tuvalu's relations with Cuba ==
Tuvalu recognises the government of Cuba and the government of Tuvalu has, since 2008, stated a desire for the U.S. to review its relationship with Cuba. The Deputy Prime Minister Vete Sakaio stated in his 2013 speech to the U.N. that “Tuvalu also fully supports the lifting of the embargos against Cuba. This will allow the Republic of Cuba to further consolidate and enhance its cooperation with Small Islands Developing States like Tuvalu.”

== See also ==
- Foreign relations of Tuvalu
- Foreign relations of the United States
- United States Ambassador to Tuvalu
