= Mutryce Williams =

Permanent Representative of Saint Kitts and Nevis to the United Nations
- Incumbent
- Assumed office 15 January 2024
- Governor-General: Marcella Liburd
- Prime Minister: Terrance Drew
- Preceded by: Nerys Dockery

Personal details
- Born: Saint Kitts and Nevis
- Education: Midwestern State University; University of Dallas; Walden University

Mutryce Williams is a Kittitian civil servant, security expert, women’s rights activist and political ambassador. From January 2024, she has served as Permanent Representative of Saint Kitts and Nevis to the United Nations. From January 2025 she has served as Chairman of the Group of Latin American and Caribbean States (GRULAC) at the United Nations.

== Education ==
Williams holds a bachelor’s degree in business administration from Midwestern State University, a master’s degree in politics from the University of Dallas and a doctorate in Public Policy Administration from Walden University, specializing in Terrorism, Mediation and Peace, and Homeland Security Policy and Coordination. Her PhD thesis led to her induction into the Hall of Fame for International Women in Emergency Management (InWEM).

== Career ==
From 2006 to 2007, Williams sat on the Saint Kitts and Nevis Electoral Reform Consultative Committee. She was the National Coordinator for the UNESCO Youth Poverty Alleviation through Heritage and Tourism Project. She has also worked as a Senior Political Advisor to the Prime Minister of Saint Kitts and Nevis, Terrance Drew.

Williams was appointed as the Permanent Representative of Saint Kitts and Nevis to the United Nations on 15 January 2024, during a ceremony at the United Nations Headquarters in New York. She succeeded Nerys Dockery. She was also appointed Chair of the Caribbean Community Group (CARICOM) at the United Nations in 2024.

Since her appointment to the United Nations, Williams has addressed the 68th session of the Commission on the Status of Women (CSW) on advancing gender equality and addressing poverty. She has addressed the UN Security Council on insecurity in Haiti.

Williams has also worked on improving diplomatic relations with other countries. She has signed a joint communique at the Permanent Mission of Pakistan to the United Nations to work towards establishing a diplomatic relationship between St Kitts and Nevis and Pakistan. She has signed a visa waiver agreement with the Permanent Representative of the Republic of Kazakhstan to the United Nations, Akan Rakhmetullin, to grant visa-free access between the two countries. In December 2024, Ilana Seid of Palau led a UN delegation of allies to Taiwan, which included ambassadors Williams of Saint Kitts and Nevis, Tapugao Falefou of Tuvalu and Menissa Rambally of Saint Lucia.

On 6 January 2025, Williams succeeded Menossa Rambally, Permanent Representative of Saint Lucia to the United Nations, as Chairman of the Group of Latin American and Caribbean States (GRULAC) at the United Nations.
