= Javier Loayza =

Bolivian diplomat

Javier Loayza Barea is a Bolivian diplomat. He has served as the Permanent Representative to the United Nations (UN Ambassador) of Bolivia. He served as President of the UNICEF Executive Board at the international level in 2007.
