= Menissa Rambally =

Saint Lucian politician

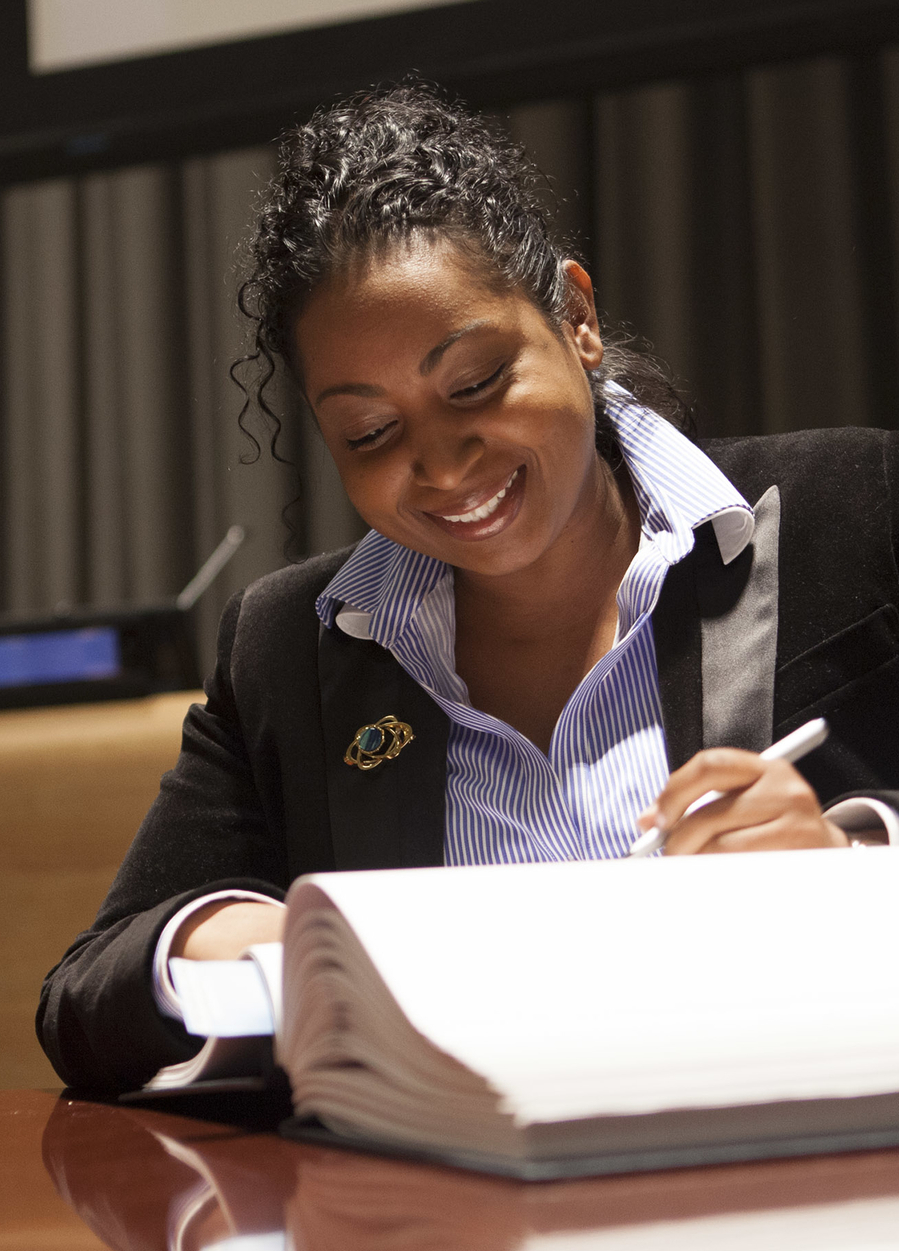
- Rambally in 2013

Permanent Representative of Saint Lucia to the United Nations in New York
- Incumbent
- Assumed office 2012
- Prime Minister: Kenny Anthony; Allen Chastanet

Member of Parliament for Castries South East, Parliament of Saint Lucia
- In office 24 May 1997 – 11 December 2006
- Prime Minister: Kenny Anthony
- Minister: Tourism and Civil Aviation (2000-2001); Social Transformation, Culture and Local Government (2001-2006)
- Succeeded by: Guy Joseph

Personal details
- Born: 16 January 1976 (age 50) St. Lucia
- Party: Saint Lucia Labour Party
- Education: Leon Hess Comprehensive Secondary School
- Alma mater: Caribbean Union College

Menissa Rambally (born 16 January 1976) is a Saint Lucian politician and diplomat. She represented the Castries South East constituency for the Saint Lucia Labour Party, until she was defeated in the general election of 11 December 2006.

Rambally was the Minister of Culture in the government of the Saint Lucia Labour Party and the youngest MP in both the country's history and the English-speaking Commonwealth.

Rambally was appointed Permanent Representative for Saint Lucia to the United Nations (UN) in 2012 and has served as Chairman of the UN Special Committee on Decolonization and as Chairman of the UN Group of Latin American and Caribbean States (GRULAC).

== Early life and education ==
Rambally was born on 16 January 1976 in Saint Lucia. She is the eldest daughter of Nelista Rambally and Hezekiah Rambally, and has two sisters called Pearl and Shameela. She is of Indian, African and European ancestry.

Rambally was educated at the Leon Hess Comprehensive Secondary School. She is a Business graduate of the Trinidad and Tobago campus of the Caribbean Union College, an affiliate of Andrews University, Michigan, United States.

Rambally is a member of the Seventh-day Adventist Church.

== Career ==
=== Politics ===
Menissa entered politics due to the death of her father who had been selected as the Saint Lucia Labour Party candidate for the Castries Southeast constituency. Upon entering the race in May 1997, she challenged the seat for the opposition. Rambally was the youngest candidate and the youngest MP in both the country's history and in the English-speaking Commonwealth, entering the Parliament of Saint Lucia at 21 years of age. The election of Rambally and Sarah Flood Beaubrun in 1997 and 2001 respectively, according to Cynthia Barrow-Giles, "transformed the St Lucia lower House of Parliament from a virtual 'all boys camp' to a more gender integrated elected parliament".

Rambally served in the Ministry of Agriculture, as Acting Minister for Education, Human Resource Development, Youth and Sports, as Minister of Tourism and Civil Aviation (2000-2001), as Minister of Ecclesiastical Affairs, and as Minister for Social Transformation, Culture and Local Government (2001-2006). She was the youngest person in modern Caribbean politics to hold full a ministerial office when she became Minister of Tourism and Civil Aviation. After her loss to Guy Joseph in the general election of 11 December 2006, she began working as a political consultant and social policy advisor from 2007 to 2011.

=== United Nations ===
Rambally was appointed Permanent Representative for St. Lucia to the United Nations in New York in 2012, presenting her credentials to the United Nations Secretary General António Guterres. Rambally published the book St. Lucia: The United Nations Journey 1979-2016, in 2018.

Rambally was elected Chairman of the United Nations Special Committee on Decolonization on 16 February 2023. She was also Chairman of the Group of Latin American and Caribbean States (GRULAC), until her succession by Mutryce Williams in 2025. In December 2024 Ilana Seid led a delegation of Taiwan's allies to Taiwan. The delegation included Mutryce Williams of Saint Kitts and Nevis, Ambassador Tapugao Falefou from Tuvalu and Rambally.

In 2024, Rambally formally established formal diplomatic relations between St. Lucia and Pakistan, signing a joint communiqué at the Pakistan Mission in New York alongside Pakistan's Permanent Representative to the UN Muneer Akram.
