= Kenson Casimir =

Saint Lucian politician

The Right Honourable Kenson Casimir MP
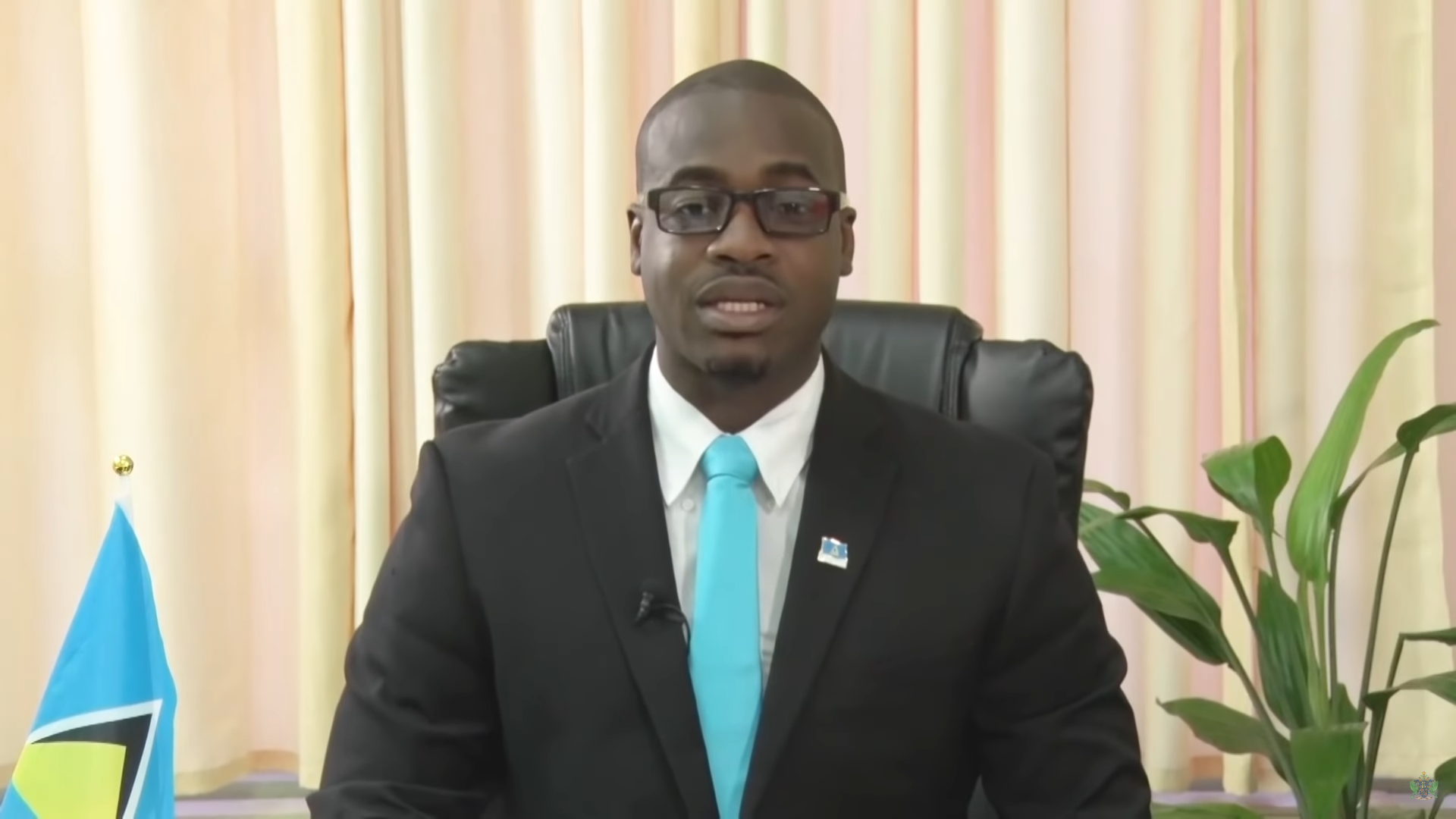

Member of Parliament for Gros Islet
- Assuming office 26 July 2021
- Succeeding: Lenard Montoute

Minister for Education, Youth Development and Sports, and Digital Transformation
- Incumbent
- Assumed office 5 August 2021

Personal details
- Born: Kenson Casimir
- Party: Saint Lucia Labour Party
- Education: Leon Hess Comprehensive Secondary School, Sir Arthur Lewis Community College, Grambling State University, Rajasthan Institute of Engineering and Technology and Netaji Subhas University of Technology
- Nickname: Bay Bay

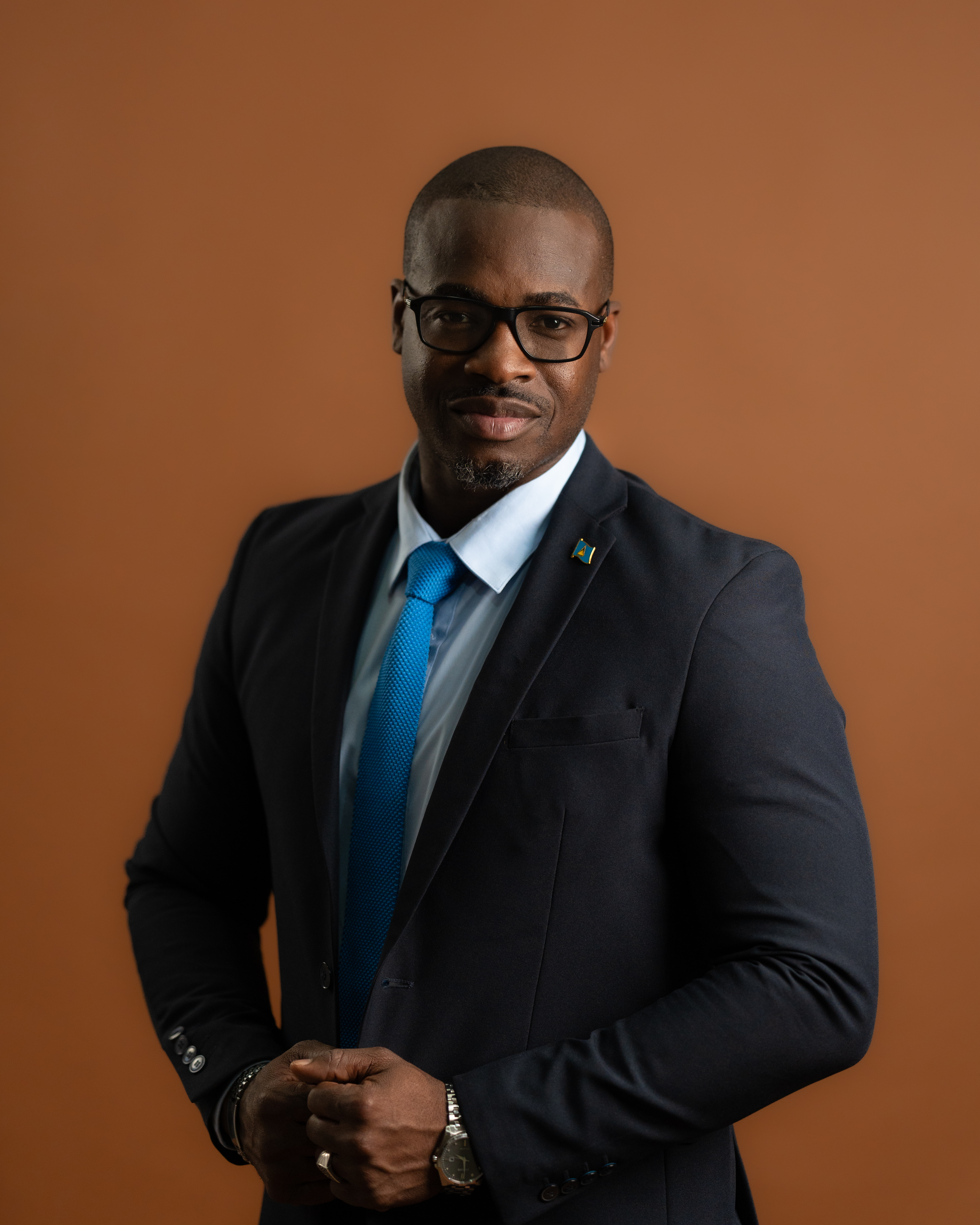
Hon. Kenson J. Casimir

Kenson Joel Casimir is a Saint Lucian politician and former broadcaster who currently serves as the Minister for Education, Youth Development, Sport and Digital Transformation. A member of the Saint Lucia Labour Party (SLP), he represents the constituency of Gros Islet in the House of Assembly. In the 2025 general election, Casimir set multiple national electoral records, including receiving the highest number of individual votes in the country's history.

== Political Career ==
Casimir first entered elective politics in the 2021 general election, where he contested the Gros Islet seat for the Saint Lucia Labour Party. He defeated the incumbent, Lenard Montoute of the United Workers Party, receiving 7,077 votes. Following the SLP's victory, he was appointed Minister for Youth Development and Sports.

=== 2025 General Election ===
In the general election held on December 1, 2025, Casimir secured a historic second term. He became the first Member of Parliament for Gros Islet to be re-elected in 24 years. Casimir received 8,175 votes, the highest total ever recorded by a single candidate in Saint Lucian electoral history. His victory margin of 4,314 votes also established a new national record for the largest margin of victory in a general election.

Following the election, his ministerial portfolio was expanded to include Education and Digital Transformation.

== Ministerial Tenure (2021–present) ==
During his first term as Minister for Youth Development and Sports, Casimir oversaw a significant expansion of Saint Lucia's sporting infrastructure and programs:

- Established Saint Lucia's Alternative Sports Sector, creating avenues for young people to engage in non-traditional sports outside formal sporting organizations.
- Established the Saint Lucia High Performance Cricket Centre, which produced 11 players competing at regional and international levels.
- Instituted Saint Lucia's first-ever Semi-Professional Football League, using football as a vehicle for community development and providing players with compensation for training and playing.
- Established a fully functioning Saint Lucia Semi-Professional Cricket League.
- Rehabilitated a record 20 playing fields in a single term in office — the most ever completed in one parliamentary term.
- Elected Chair of the OECS Council of Youth and Sports Ministers, a recognition of his regional leadership and Saint Lucia's growing influence in Caribbean sports development.
- Pioneered the use of solar energy in sports infrastructure, with the Corinth Playing Field becoming the first solar-operated sports facility in the OECS.

=== Support for Julien Alfred ===
In 2023, during the debate on the Estimates of Revenue and Expenditure, Casimir announced a specific budgetary allocation of $250,000 to support sprinter Julien Alfred. The funds were designated to facilitate her transition from collegiate to professional athletics, covering training fees, nutrition, and psychological support. Casimir stated at the time that the investment was intended to allow Alfred to focus exclusively on securing a global medal for Saint Lucia. In 2024, Alfred went on to win Saint Lucia's first-ever Olympic medals (Gold and Silver) at the Paris Summer Games.

== Constituency Achievements ==
Casimir developed a reputation as a highly active constituency representative during his first term, earning the informal designation "Boss of the North" for his extensive infrastructure program in Gros Islet. During his first term representing Gros Islet, Casimir focused heavily on infrastructure and community services. Economists noted Gros Islet as one of the fastest-growing constituencies in the OECS during this period. Key projects included:

- The construction and refurbishment of 73 roads within four years.
- The construction of a new community center in Grande Riviere.
- The building of a new police station and a multi-sport mini-stadium.
- Expansion of the Gros Islet Polyclinic (health facility).
- The addition of an administrative wing to the Gros Islet Fisheries Complex.

== Electoral History ==
Election Year	Constituency	Party	Votes	%	Result
2021	Gros Islet	SLP	7,077	58.0%	Won
2025	Gros Islet	SLP	8,175	67.9%	Won

== Education ==
Casimir attended the Leon Hess Comprehensive Secondary School. He later received an Academic Award for Sociology in the Sir Arthur Lewis Graduating Class of 2006. He went on to receive first class honours at Grambling State University obtaining his bachelor's degree in Business Management and master's degree in Mass communication. Casimir holds several certifications in Human resource management at Rajasthan Institute of Technology and Applied Man Power Planning at Delhi Institute of Technology which he pursued in India.

== Career Before Politics ==
Before entering politics, Casimir had a multifaceted career in media, education, and public service. He served as a sports broadcaster and journalist, including as the sports anchor at MBC Television. He also worked as a teacher, lecturer, youth officer, and social transformation officer. As an athlete himself, Casimir competed in track and field and cricket.
