= Riet =

Riet or RIET may refer to:

- Riet, Germany, a village in Baden-Württemberg, Germany
- Riet, Switzerland, a settlement in the municipality of Neftenbach in the Swiss canton of Zürich
- Rajasthan Institute of Engineering and Technology, in India
