= Nerys Dockery =

Ambassador from Saint Kitts and Nevis

Secretary-General of the Saint Kitts and Nevis National Commission for UNESCO
- Incumbent
- Assumed office February 2025
- Preceded by: Dorothy Warner

Permanent Representative of Saint Kitts and Nevis to the United Nations in New York
- In office 2022–2023
- Governors-General: Tapley Seaton; Marcella Liburd
- Prime Minister: Terrance Drew
- Preceded by: Ian Liburd
- Succeeded by: Mutryce Williams

Personal details
- Born: Nerys Nakia Chiverton Saint Kitts and Nevis
- Party: Saint Kitts and Nevis Labour Party
- Education: York University; Diplomatic Academy of Vienna

Nerys Nakia Dockery (née Chiverton) is a Kittitian civil servant, politician and political ambassador. She formerly served as Public Relations Officer and Director of International Affairs, then as General Secretary and chief executive officer of the St. Kitts and Nevis Labour Party, and as Permanent Representative of Saint Kitts and Nevis to the United Nations (UN) in New York. As of 2025, Dockery is Secretary-General of the Saint Kitts and Nevis National Commission for UNESCO.

== Education ==
Dockery holds a Bachelor of Arts in political science and law and society from York University in Toronto, Canada and a Master of Arts in advanced international studies from the Diplomatic Academy of Vienna, Austria. She also achieved a postgraduate diploma in Public Relations and Corporate Communications from Seneca Polytechnic in Toronto, Canada.

== Career ==
=== Early diplomatic career ===
Dockery worked in the Ministry of Foreign Affairs of Saint Kitts and Nevis from 2004 to 2011. In 2007, she chaired the inaugural Diplomatic Week. She was a Special Assistant in the Office of the Director General of the Organisation of Eastern Caribbean States (OECS) from 2011 to 2013. She was Senior Foreign Service Officer in the Ministry of Foreign Affairs of Saint Kitts and Nevis from 2014 to 2015.

Between 2016 and 2017, Dockery was a Senior Support Services Officer and a faculty member of Continuing Education and Corporate Training for Seneca College in Saint Kitts and Nevis.

Dockery was Public Relations Officer and Director of International Affairs of the Saint Kitts and Nevis Labour Party from 2018 to 2020 and was General Secretary and chief executive officer from March 2022.

=== UN posting ===
From 24 October 2022, was appointed as Permanent Representative of Saint Kitts and Nevis to the United Nations in New York, succeeding Ian Liburd and presenting her credentials to UN Secretary General António Guterres. In November 2022, Dockery called for an end to the embargo imposed on the Republic of Cuba by the United States of America, giving a Presentation on the "Resolution on the Necessity of Ending the Economic, Commercial and Financial Embargo by the US against Cuba."

In February 2023, Dockery addressed the UN Security Council and signed the Book of Condolences on behalf of Saint Kitts and Nevis at the Permanent Mission of Turkey to the UN after the loss of life during an earthquake. In March 2023, she attended the United Nations Water Conference, co-hosted by the Governments of Tajikistan and the Netherlands, and supported the BBNJ Agreement for ocean protection.

Dockery joined the United Nations' Economic and Social Council (ECOSOC) Ad Hoc Advisory Group on Haiti in April 2023, and represented Saint Kitts and Nevis during the second session of the United Nations Permanent Forum on People of African Descent (PFPAD) in May 2023. In June 2023, Dockery reaffirmed support for Morocco's sovereignty and territorial integrity.

In August 2023, she met with leaders of the Saint Kitts and Nevis diaspora in the Bronx, New York City. In September 2023, she represented Saint Kitts and Nevis at the Caribbean Community (CARICOM) Council for Foreign and Community Relations (COFCOR) meeting, which discussed economic cooperation and climate resilience.

=== Recall from the UN ===
Dockery was recalled for consultations with immediate effect in late September 2023. An interim representative, Ghisliane Williams, was posted, until Dockery's succession by Mutryce Williams. It was reported by radio station WINNFM that there had allegedly been a disagreement about seating protocol between Dockery and the then Minister of Foreign Affairs, Denzil Douglas, at the 78th ordinary sitting of the United Nations General Assembly. Dockery went on strike from her diplomatic duties. She later resumed her work for the Ministry of Foreign Affairs, including supporting African Liberation Day in May 2024.

=== Later career ===
In February 2025, Dockery was appointed as Secretary-General of the Saint Kitts and Nevis National Commission for the United Nations Educational, Scientific and Cultural Organization (UNESCO), succeeding Dorothy Warner who was retiring.

In this role Dockery has promoted the future integration of "African Ancestral History" in the national educational curriculum and a possible city-twinning initiative connecting African seaports along the historic transatlantic slave trade route to locations in Saint Kitts and Nevis. In April 2025, Dockery addressed the Global Youth Leadership Initiative at the UN headquarters with the keynote speech "Future We Want: Global Initiative for Young Leaders," which covered the disproportionate impact of climate change on Small Island Developing States (SIDS) and the interconnectedness of the UN Sustainable Development Goals (SDGs). In April 2025 she also launched a UNESCO Ministry of Education Essay Competition for all SKN secondary school students.

Dockery has also sought technical support from the UN, coordinating UNESCO interventions through the New Earth Network Initiative for the Saint Mary's Biosphere reserve with her colleague Telca Wallace, the Saint Kitts and Nevis Permanent Delegate to the UNESCO headquarters in Paris, France. A public consultation on the transformation of the St. Mary's Biosphere Reserve into a Centre of Excellence for eliminating single-use plastics, aligned with the national plastic ban, will be undertaken in July 2025.

Dockery has also held positions in the private sector, working as a Financial Adviser at Sagicor Life Inc. for the Eastern Caribbean. She is executive director and owner of Finesse Consulting Service.
