= Ilana Seid =

Palauan diplomat

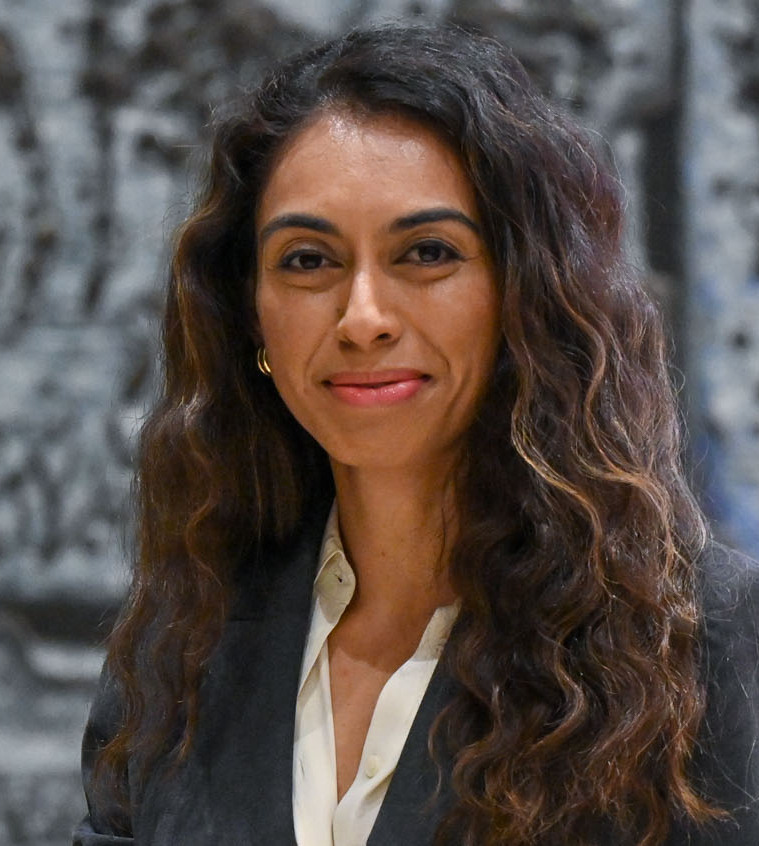
- in 2022
- Education: Stanford University
- Occupations: software engineer, banker, e-commerce and diplomat
- Employer(s): Lehman Brothers and Nomura Securities
- Known for: Ambassador to the United Nations
- Title: Her excellency

Ilana Victoria Seid is a Palauan ambassador to the United Nations. She also chairs the Pacific Small Islands Developing States (PSIDS) which lobbies at the United Nations on behalf of 14 small nations.

== Life ==
Seid graduated from Stanford University with a degree in economics. She worked as an intern at Palau's office in New York in 2005. She had positions in banking in Japan, Hong Kong, Singapore and New York while employed by the now defunct American bank of Lehman Brothers and the Japanese Nomura Securities. She also worked in New York as a software engineer.

Seid was interested in interior design and she created an e-commerce company called, Sunday-Morning.com.

Seid was Palau's ambassador to the United Nations in 2021 and she presented her credentials to the UN's Secretary General on 16 September. She is based in New York where she is the chair of the Pacific Small Islands Developing States (PSIDS). This group lobbys at the United Nations on behalf of 14 small nations including Micronesia, Fiji, Kiribati, Palau and Vanuatu.

In 2022, she went to Israel as she was also Palau's first (non-resident) ambassador to that country.

In 2023, she addressed the 3rd Annual Indo-Pacific Islands Dialogue in New York. The Pacific Islands discussion was organised by the Sasakawa Peace Foundation and the Carnegie Endowment for International Peace.

Palau made an early agreement of the High Seas Treaty or BBNJ (United Nations Convention on the Law of the Sea on the Conservation and Sustainable Use of Marine Biological Diversity of Areas Beyond National Jurisdiction) in January 2024. She presented Palau's agreement which was the first made by any state.

Seid was a principle foreign guest at the coronation of Charles III and Queen Camilla on 6 May 2024. She was invited as the Ambassador of the Republic of Palau to the United Nations.

In December 2024, she led a delegation of Taiwan's allies to Taiwan. The delegation included Mutryce Williams of Saint Kitts and Nevis, Saint Lucia's Ambassador Menissa Rambally and Ambassador Tapugao Falefou from Tuvalu.
