= Leon Hess Comprehensive Secondary School =

Secondary school in Castries, Saint Lucia

Location
- Castries; Saint Lucia
- Coordinates: 13.9996°N 60.9789°W

Information
- Type: Secondary School
- Motto: Education for Service
- Established: 1985
- Authority: Ministry of Education
- Head teacher: Florence Gustave-Denis
- Grades: Form 1 - Form 5 (5 Years)
- Gender: Mixed
- Age range: 11-16
- Enrollment: ~700
- Houses: Ellis, Jesse, Bourne, Leon
- Colours: Black, White and Green

Leon Hess Comprehensive Secondary School is a secondary school located in Castries, Saint Lucia. The school was established on 26 October 1985 by a donation to the Saint Lucian government from Leon Hess. The school's present principal is Mrs. Florence Gustave-Denis and its first principal was Mrs. Jane Bourne. The school's team (house) colours are as follows:

Lewis, which was named after Sir. Arthur Lewis (blue), was changed to the Ellis house in October 2016; which was named after former principal Mr. Rupert Ellis.

== Houses ==
Jesse which was named after father Charles Jesse (red).

Bourne which was named after Mrs. Jane Bourne (green).

Leon which was named after Mr. Leon Hess (yellow).

== Motto ==
The school's motto is "Education for Service".

== Notable alumni ==
- Johnson Charles
- Kenson Casimir
- Julien Alfred
- Menissa Rambally, politician
