= Permanent Representative of Tuvalu to the United Nations =

Permanent Representative of Tuvalu
- Flag of the United Nations
- Incumbent; Tapugao Falefou since 13 February 2023
- Inaugural holder: Enele Sopoaga
- Formation: 2001

This is a list of the Permanent Representatives of Tuvalu to the United Nations. The current office holder is H. E. Tapugao Falefou.

The UN Permanent Representative is also appointed as Tuvalu's ambassador to the United States.

== List ==
No.	Image	Permanent Representative	Years served	United Nations Secretary-General
1		Enele Sopoaga	3 July 2001 – 19 December 2006	Kofi Annan
2		Afelee Falema Pita	19 December 2006 – 31 December 2006	Kofi Annan
2		Afelee Falema Pita	1 January 2007 - 20 December 2012	Ban Ki-moon
3		Aunese Makoi Simati	20 December 2012 – 31 December 2016	Ban Ki-moon
3		Aunese Makoi Simati	1 January 2017 - 21 July 2017	António Guterres
4		Samuelu Laloniu	21 July 2017 – 19 January 2023	António Guterres
5		Tapugao Falefou	13 February 2023	António Guterres

== See also ==
- Foreign relations of Tuvalu
