= List of diplomatic missions in Tuvalu =

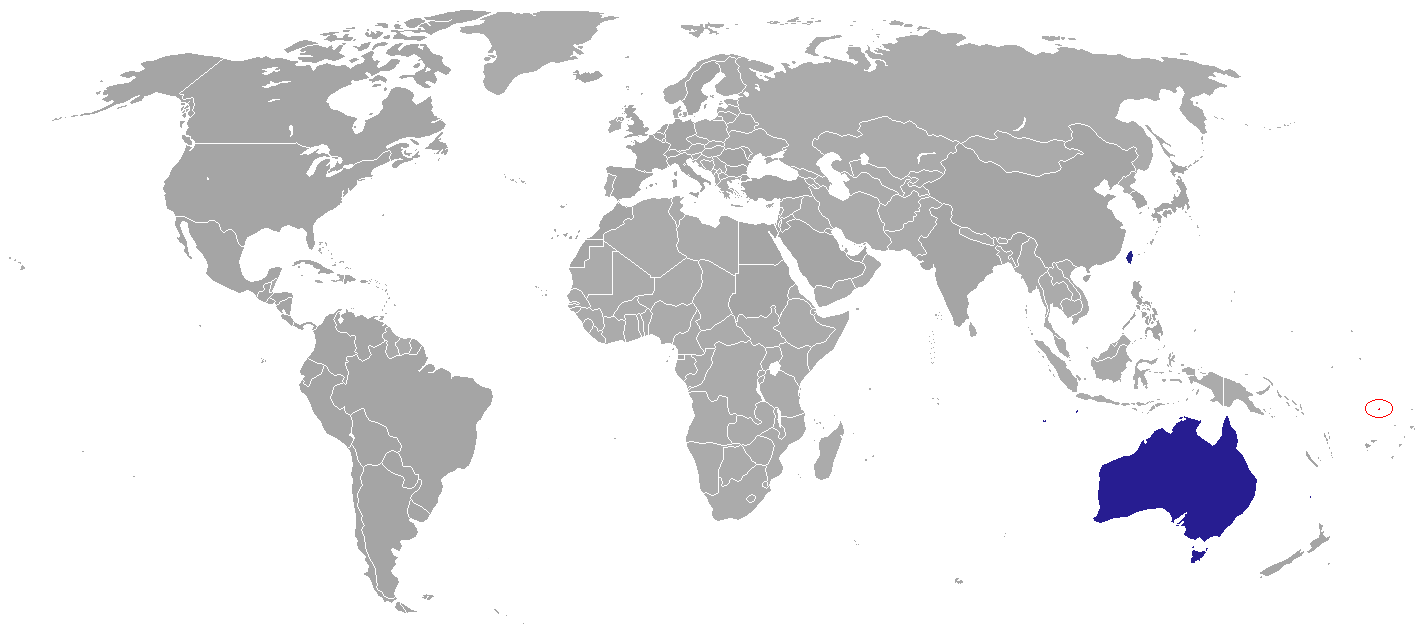
Diplomatic missions in Tuvalu

This is a list of diplomatic missions in Tuvalu. At present, the capital of Funafuti hosts two diplomatic missions.

== Missions in Funafuti ==
- Australia – High Commission
- Taiwan – Embassy

== Non-resident high commissions and embassies ==
Resident in Canberra, Australia:

- Austria
- Colombia
- Denmark
- Finland
- Morocco
- Paraguay
- Philippines
- Poland
- Portugal
- Romania
- Serbia
- Slovakia
- South Africa
- Switzerland

Resident in Suva, Fiji:

- France
- Indonesia
- Japan
- Malaysia
- New Zealand
- South Korea
- United Kingdom
- United States

Resident in Wellington, New Zealand:

- Belgium
- Brazil
- Canada
- Germany
- Italy
- Mexico
- Turkey

Resident in other locations:

- Czech Republic (Kuala Lumpur)
- Greece (Tokyo)
- Ireland (Wellington)
- Israel (Jerusalem)
- Kosovo (Tokyo)
- Lesotho (Tokyo)
- Seychelles (New York City)

== See also ==
- Foreign relations of Tuvalu
- List of diplomatic missions of Tuvalu
