= Aunese Simati =

Tuvaluan diplomat (born 1967)

His Excellency Aunese Makoi Simati
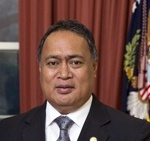
- Simati in 2013

Permanent Representative of Tuvalu to the United Nations
- In office 20 December 2012 – 21 July 2017
- Prime Minister: Willy Telavi; Enele Sopoaga
- Secretary General: Ban Ki-moon
- Preceded by: Afelee F. Pita
- Succeeded by: Samuelu Laloniu

Ambassador to the United Arab Emirates
- Incumbent
- Assumed office 2022
- Prime Minister: Kausea Natano
- Preceded by: First appointment

Personal details
- Born: 22 April 1967 (age 59)
- Education: Waikato University
- Profession: Diplomat

Aunese Makoi Simati (born 22 April 1967), is a Tuvaluan diplomat. Simati was appointed as Tuvalu's Ambassador to the United Arab Emirates (UAE), after Tuvalu opened an embassy to the UAE in Abu Dhabi in April 2022. He was Tuvalu's Permanent Representative to the United Nations from 20 December 2012 to July 2017.

He studied at Waikato University (New Zealand), obtaining a Master's degree in social science (economics and geography). He worked as a civil servant in the Tuvaluan Ministry of Finance, Economic Planning and Industries from 1991 to 2003, in the Department of Planning, rising to the position of Senior Assistant Secretary in that department in 1999. In 2003, he was promoted to the position of Acting Permanent Secretary in the Ministry of Communications and Transport, then became Permanent Secretary in the Ministry of Home Affairs and Rural Development in 2005; he returned to the Ministry of Finance, Economic Planning and Industries, as Permanent Secretary, in 2006.

In 2009, he began a diplomatic career, being appointed Permanent Secretary in the Department of Foreign Affairs, within the Office of the Prime Minister (who at that time was Apisai Ielemia). The following year, he was appointed as Tuvalu's High Commissioner to Fiji. On 20 December 2012, he presented his credentials to United Nations Secretary-General Ban Ki-moon, as Tuvalu's Permanent Representative to the United Nations. He simultaneously served as Tuvaluan Ambassador to the United States, having presented his credentials to President Barack Obama on 14 January 2013.

Diplomatic posts
Preceded by Afelee F. Pita	Permanent Representative of Tuvalu to the United Nations; 2012–2017	Succeeded by Samuelu Laloniu
New office	Ambassador to the United Arab Emirates; 2022 to present	Succeeded by Incumbent
