= Afelee F. Pita =

Tuvaluan diplomat

Afelee Falema Pita
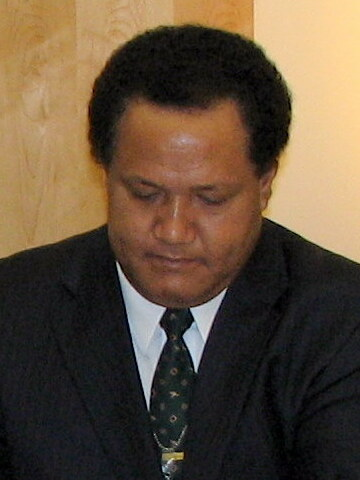
- Pitaga in 2011

Permanent Representative of Tuvalu to the United Nations
- In office 19 December 2006 – 20 December 2012
- Secretary General: Kofi Annan; Ban Ki-moon
- Prime Minister: Apisai Ielemia; Maatia Toafa; Willy Telavi
- Preceded by: Enele Sopoaga
- Succeeded by: Aunese Simati

Personal details
- Born: 11 February 1958 (age 68)
- Education: University of the South Pacific
- Profession: Diplomat

Afelee Falema Pita (born 11 February 1958) is a Tuvaluan diplomat. He was Tuvalu's Permanent Representative to the United Nations from 19 December 2006 to December 2012, and was also the ambassador to the United States.

Pita holds a master's degree in public administration from the University of Canberra and a Bachelor of Arts degree in administration and accounting from the University of the South Pacific.

He began his career as a senior official in government administration as assistant Secretary, and then Secretary, at the Tuvaluan Ministry of Commerce and Natural Resources, from 1987 to 1988. He was Assistant Secretary for Commerce from 1989 to 1993, then Acting Secretary at the Ministry of Trade, Commerce and Public Corporations in 1993. From 1994 to 1994, he served as Permanent Secretary in several successive ministries (Health and Sports, Labour and Communication, Resources and Environment, Finance).

From 2001 to 2004, Pita was Adviser to the Executive Director of the Asian Development Bank in Manila, where he served as representative for Australia, Azerbaijan, Cambodia, Hong Kong, Kiribati, the Federated States of Micronesia, Nauru, the Solomon Islands and Tuvalu.

Returning to Tuvalu, Pita served as Permanent Secretary to the Ministry of Natural Resources and Lands from 2004 and 2006, before being appointed as Permanent Representative to the United Nations.

In April 2007, Pita addressed the Special Session of the United Nations Security Council on Energy, Climate and Security, and "beseech[ed] the Security Council to act urgently to address the threats to [Tuvalu]'s national security" - namely, climate change.

Diplomatic posts
Preceded by Enele Sopoaga	Permanent Representative of Tuvalu to the United Nations; 2006–2012	Succeeded by Aunese Simati
