= Samuelu Laloniu =

Tuvaluan diplomat

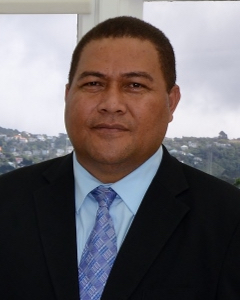
- Laloniu in 2015

Permanent Representative of Tuvalu to the United Nations
- In office 21 July 2017 – 19 January 2023
- Secretary General: António Guterres
- Prime Minister: Enele Sopoaga; Kausea Natano
- Preceded by: Aunese Simati
- Succeeded by: Tapugao Falefou

Personal details
- Born: 14 May 1969 (age 57)
- Spouse: Tarataake Laloniu
- Education: University of Otago; Victoria University of Wellington
- Profession: Diplomat

Samuelu Laloniu (born 14 May 1969) is a career diplomat from Tuvalu. He took up his post as the Permanent Representative to the United Nations on 21 July 2017. He also presented his credentials as Tuvalu's ambassador to the United States on 21 July 2017. He vacated his offices on 19 January 2023.

Laloniu was most recently the Tuvaluan High Commissioner to New Zealand since 2015, having previously served as Consul General in Auckland, in New Zealand between 2010 and 2014. For six months between 2009 and 2010, he served as Tuvalu's Deputy Permanent Representative to the United Nations in New York, and as Deputy High Commissioner to Fiji from 2006 to 2009.

Laloniu's other government positions included Assistant Secretary at the Ministry of Communications and Transport between 2000 and 2004, and Private Secretary to the Prime Minister of Tuvalu from 1998 to 2000. In 1997, he served as a Pacific Regional Project Associate with the Food and Agriculture Organization of the United Nations in the Fiji office, prior to which he was a Fisheries Research and Development Officer at the Ministry of Natural Resources from 1994 to 1996.

He is a graduate of the University of Otago in New Zealand, and then earned a Master of Arts degree in public policy from Victoria University in Wellington, New Zealand.

== Published works ==
- Laloniu, Samuelu, chapters on “Land” and “Singing and Dancing” published in Tuvalu: A History (1983) Larcy, Hugh (eds.), Institute of Pacific Studies, University of the South Pacific and Government of Tuvalu

Diplomatic posts
Preceded by Aunese Simati	Permanent Representative of Tuvalu to the United Nations; 2017–2023	Succeeded by Tapugao Falefou
