= Rajasthan Institute of Engineering and Technology =

Rajasthan Institute in India known for providing quality Technical education

Rajasthan Institute of Engineering and Technology, Jaipur
- RIET-Jaipur
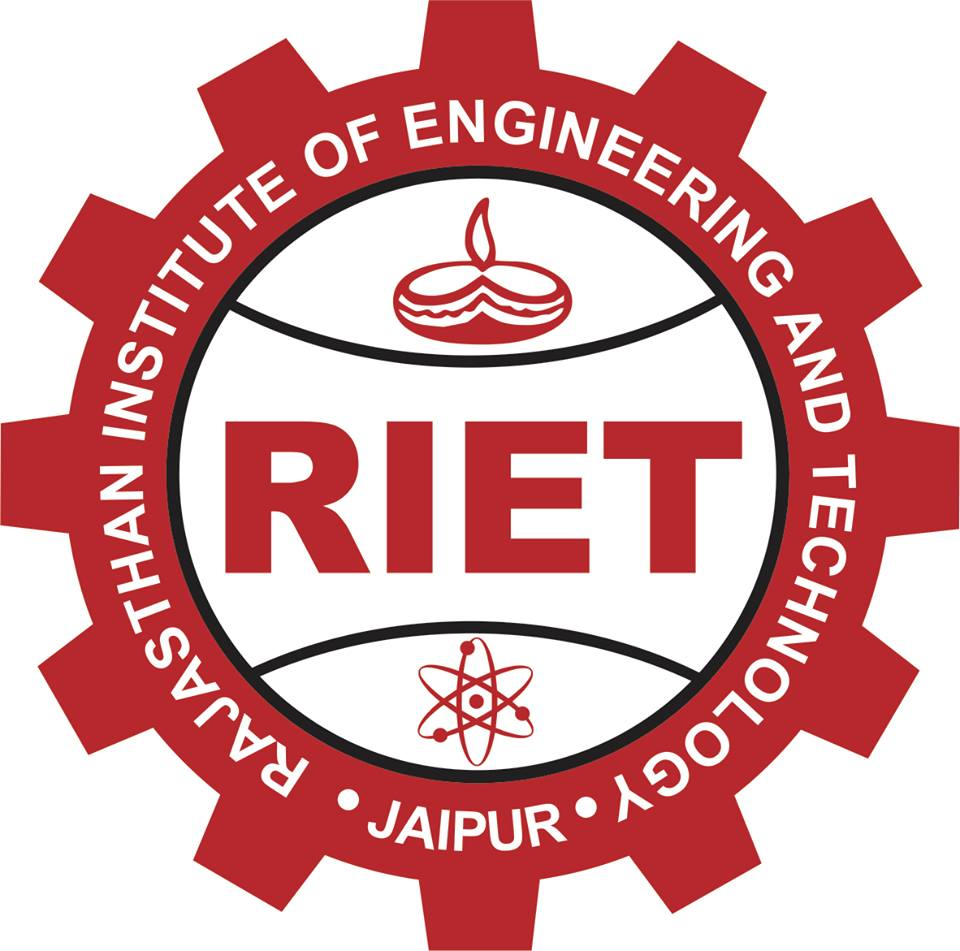
- Motto: Where Success Has No Limits..
- Type: Engineering Institution
- Established: 2000
- Affiliations: Rajasthan Technical University-Kota
- Principal: Dr. Saroj Hiranwal
- Location: Jaipur, Rajasthan, India
- Campus: Urban
- Acronym: RIET-Jaipur
- Website: www.rietjaipur.ac.in

The Rajasthan Institute of Engineering and Technology is an educational institute run under the aegis of the Chandrawati Education Society since 2000. The society is registered with the Registrar of Societies, Government of N.C.T. Delhi vide registration No. S.35514 of 1999, under the Societies Registration Act of 1860 with aim of providing quality technical education. The society established RIET, its first institution, in 2000, with the approval of the All India Council for Technical Education (AICTE), Ministry of HRD, and accredited by the Government of India & NBA.

== Academics ==
The institute offers seven four-year undergraduate courses of study leading to a Bachelor of Technology degree: Computer Science Engineering, Electrical Engineering, Electronics and Communication, Information Technology, Mechanical Engineering, Civil Engineering, and Electrical & Electronics Engineering.

Admissions to the institute are through the Joint Entrance Examination, [Rajasthan Engineering Admission Process], and Management Quota.

RIET, Jaipur, is a wireless institute, with wired as well as wireless networks linking the entire campus.

== Departments ==
Department of B.Tech

- Computer Science Engineering
- Electrical & Electronics Engineering
- Electronics and Communication Engineering
- Mechanical Engineering
- Information Technology
- Civil Engineering
- Electrical Engineering

Department of M.Tech

- Digital Communication
- Computer Science Engineering
- Power System
- Production Engineering
- VLSI Design
- Software Engineering

MBA

- Information Technology
- Finance
- Marketing
- HRM

MCA

== Academic programs ==
The institute runs programs leading to the degree of Bachelor of Technology (B.Tech.), Master of Technology (MTech.), Master of Business Administration (M.B.A), and Master of Computer Applications (MCA) in the following areas.

Degree	Specialization
Bachelor of Technology (B. Tech.)	Computer Science Engineering, Electrical & Electronics Engineering, Electronics, and Communication Engineering, Information Technology, Mechanical Engineering, Electrical Engineering & Civil Engineering.
Masters of Technology (M.Tech)	Digital Communication, Computer Science Engineering, Power System, Production Engineering, VLSI Design, and Software Engineering.
Master of Business Administration (M.B.A)	General Management
Master of Computer Applications (M.C.A)	General

== Facilities ==
Library- The library is computerized and has 30000 books in the fields of engineering, technology, management, and related areas. It has a subscription to E-journals (Science Direct option IV) and 85 technical magazines and national and international journals. A book bank facility is available for the students, also an SC/ST book bank. It has a 6,000 sq ft (560 m2) reading and stacking area, with space for 100 readers at a time.

Digital Library- RIET Digital library has 1500 CDs and audio, and video aids with multimedia systems. The digital library is connected with other national and international libraries by DELNET and has a subscription to DEL (Digital Engineering Library) through the INDEST AICTE Consortium.

Canteen- The objective of the Canteen and meal service is to protect by reducing the risk of foodborne illness, with proper sanitary conditions and preventing adulterated food. From the very beginning of the College in 2000, the College Canteen has been functioning efficiently. The canteen is located inside the College. The hostellers and day scholars are provided meals to assuring food safety and quality.

Cafeteria- There is a common room and restroom for unwell day scholars. Lunch in the hostel is available for Day scholars.

Sports- There are facilities for boxing, cricket, basketball, volleyball, and table tennis.

Wi-Fi Campus-RIET Campus is connected by 16 Mbit/s wireless internets available for students.

Air-Cooled Campus-RIET Campus is fully air-cooled.

CRT-Campus Recruitment Training Program. Students are charged 3500 extra for this.

== Extracurricular activities ==
Cultural Society- For co-curricular activities, a cultural society was established in 2001. It conducts activities like quizzes, debates, seminars, extempore presentations, group discussions, and dance competitions.

Literary Club Hogwarts is an organization of students that conducts group discussions, mock interviews, debates, and quizzes for the personality and communication skill development of students.

National Service Scheme- NSS students participate in national programs like anti-dowry and AIDS prevention programs.

Technical Society of RIET Technodiction is a national-level tech fest that organizes tech events like technical quizzes, paper presentations, software presentations, and hardware.

Sports Club There are facilities for cricket, volleyball, basketball, table tennis & badminton.

Student Activity Centre RIET's Novel initiative is to harbor and harness the talent, leadership skills, and organizational skills of its student and utilize it for the all-around development of every individual within its being. SAC is not an organization but it is an open forum inviting everyone. In addition to giving students access to resources and opportunities, it also teaches them how to succeed and give their efforts and aspirations purpose. SAC received appreciation and recommendations from the government and different sections of society.

== See also ==
- List of universities in India
- Universities and colleges in India
- Education in India
- University Grants Commission (India)
