= List of ambassadors of Tuvalu to the United States =

Coordinates: 40.663882°N 73.997221°W

Ambassador of Tuvalu to the United States
- Incumbent; Tapugao Falefou since February 13, 2023
- Inaugural holder: Ionatana Ionatana
- Formation: May 10, 1979

The Tuvalulan Ambassador in New York City is the official representative of the Government in Funafuti to the Government of the United States. Since 2010, the Tuvaluan ambassador to the United States has also been appointed as Tuvalu’s Permanent Representative to the United Nations.

- Tuvalu–United States relations

== List of ambassadors ==
| Diplomatic agreement/designated | Diplomatic accreditation | Ambassador | Observations | prime minister of Tuvalu | president of the United States | Term end |
|---|---|---|---|---|---|---|
| October 1, 1978 | | | Independence from the United Kingdom | Toaripi Lauti | Jimmy Carter | |
| April 26, 1979 | May 10, 1979 | Ionatana Ionatana | Not resident in the U.S. | Toaripi Lauti | Jimmy Carter | |
| August 6, 2010 | August 10, 2010 | Afelee F. Pita | Tuvalu's permanent representative to the United Nations | Apisai Ielemia | Barack Obama | December 20, 2012 |
| January 11, 2013 | January 14, 2013 | Aunese Simati | Tuvalu's permanent representative to the United Nations | Enele Sopoaga | Barack Obama | July 21, 2017 |
| | July 21, 2017 | Samuelu Laloniu | Tuvalu's permanent representative to the United Nations | Enele Sopoaga; Kausea Natano | Donald Trump; Joe Biden | January 19, 2023 |
| | February 13, 2023 | Tapugao Falefou | Tuvalu's permanent representative to the United Nations | Kausea Natano | Joe Biden | Incumbent |
