= Tapugao Falefou =

Permanent Representative of Tuvalu to the UN

Dr. Tapugao Falefou

Permanent Representative of Tuvalu to the United Nations
- Incumbent
- Assumed office 13 February 2023
- Secretary General: António Guterres
- Prime Minister: Kausea Natano
- Preceded by: Samuelu Laloniu

Personal details
- Born: 1968 (age 57–58)
- Spouse: Logovaka Marilyn Simmons
- Education: University of the South Pacific; Australian National University; University of Waikato
- Profession: Public servant

Tapugao Falefou (born 1968) is a Tuvaluan civil servant and diplomat. He took up his post as the Permanent Representative to the United Nations on 13 February 2023. He later presented his credentials as Tuvalu's ambassador to the United States. On 15 April 2023, Falefou presented his credentials as Tuvalu's ambassador to Cuba.

== Education ==
Falefou was awarded a bachelor's degree in public administration and management from the University of the South Pacific in Vanuatu. He subsequently studied for a master's degree in diplomacy and international public policy from the Australian National University.

Falefou also holds a doctoral degree from the University of Waikato in New Zealand. His PhD thesis was on climate change focusing on the impacts of climate change and sea level rise on national and cultural identities of low-lying countries such as Tuvalu.

== Career ==
Dr. Falefou was the Permanent Secretary for the Tuvaluan Department of Communication, Transport and Tourism from September 2006 to December 2008.

From January 2011 to January 2014, he was the Permanent Secretary for Foreign Affairs, Trade, Tourism, Environment and Labour. During 2011 and 2012 he led the team responsible for the development of the Tuvalu Climate Change Policy.

From August 2017 to July 2019, he was the Permanent Secretary for Communication and Transport.

From August 2019 to March 2020, he was the Permanent Secretary for Justice, Communication and Foreign Affairs.

From 2019 to 2021, he was Principal Adviser to the Prime Minister of Tuvalu in his capacity as Chair of the Pacific Islands Forum. From 2020 until his appointed as an ambassador, he also served as Secretary to the Government of Tuvalu, which involved being: the Principal Adviser to the Prime Minister; Principal Adviser to the Cabinet; and Head of Tuvalu's Public Service. From March 2020 to August 2021, he served as Chair of the COVID-19 Regional Task Force, and he also co-chaired, with Prime Minister Kausea Natano, Tuvalu's national COVID-19 Task Force.

Diplomatic posts
Preceded by Samuelu Laloniu	Permanent Representative of Tuvalu to the United Nations; 2023-present	Succeeded by Incumbent
