= Permanent representative to the United Nations =

Head of a diplomatic mission to the United Nations

A permanent representative to the United Nations (sometimes called a "UN ambassador") is the head of a country's diplomatic mission to the United Nations.

Of these, the most high-profile UN permanent representatives are those assigned to headquarters in New York City. However, member states also appoint permanent representatives to the other UN offices in Geneva, Vienna, and Nairobi.

Many countries call their UN permanent representative "UN ambassadors". Although a permanent representative holds the equivalent diplomatic rank of an ambassador (or chief of mission or high commissioner), they are accredited to an international organisation, and not to a head of state (as a nation's ambassador would be) or to a head of government (as a high commissioner would be).

== Representatives to UN councils ==
Some diplomats are representatives to UN councils, such as the Economic and Social Council of the United Nations.

== Goodwill ambassadors ==
UNESCO has permanent delegates heading the diplomatic missions to the organisation, rather than permanent representatives. However, there are also UNESCO Goodwill Ambassadors, such as many celebrities who act as UNESCO goodwill ambassadors for a particular thematic area. UNHCR has similar UNHCR Goodwill Ambassadors.

A UN permanent representative is sometimes called an ambassador to the UN, or rarely, a UN permanent ambassador, to distinguish the position from being a UNESCO goodwill ambassador. However, again, the term "ambassador" is more commonly used to describe each of nation's government officials who are assigned to handle some affairs with another nation.

== See also ==
- List of current permanent representatives to the United Nations
- Member states of the United Nations
- Permanent secretary
- United Nations Security Council
