= 1981 New Year Honours =

British royal recognitions

The New Year Honours 1981 were appointments by most of the Commonwealth realms of Queen Elizabeth II to various orders and honours to reward and highlight good works by citizens of those countries, and honorary ones to citizens of other countries. They were announced on 31 December 1980 to celebrate the year passed and mark the beginning of 1981.

Names and titles of recipients are shown as they appeared in this honours list.

== United Kingdom ==
=== Life barons ===
- Sir Henry Alexander Benson, G.B.E. Lately Chairman, Royal Commission on Legal Services. Adviser to the Governor of the Bank of England.
- Sir Michael Meredith Swann. Provost, Oriel College, University of Oxford. Lately Chairman, British Broadcasting Corporation.

=== Privy Counsellors ===
- His Excellency Sir Zelman Cowen, A.K., G.C.M.G., G.C.V.O. Governor-General of the Commonwealth of Australia.
- The Right Honourable Bertram Stanley Mitford, Baron Denham. Captain of the Honourable Corps of Gentlemen at Arms.
- Nigel Lawson, M.P. Financial Secretary to the Treasury. Member of Parliament for Blaby, Leicestershire.

=== Knights Bachelor ===
- John Bertram Adams, C.M.G., Director-General, European Organization for Nuclear Research.
- Lieutenant Colonel Dennis Charles Titchener-Barrett, T.D. For political and public service in the Greater London Area.
- James Whyte Black. For services to Medical Research.
- William John Charnley, C.B., Controller, Research and Development Establishments and Research, Ministry of Defence.
- Charles Fletcher Fletcher-Cooke, Q.C., M.P. For political and public service.
- Robin Day, Television and Radio Journalist.
- Anton Dolin. For services to ballet.
- Philip Frank Foreman, C.B.E., D.L., Managing Director, Short Brothers Ltd. For services to Export.
- Geoffrey Gilbertson, C.B.E., Chairman, National Advisory Council on Employment of Disabled People.
- Thomas Anthony Gore Browne, Senior Partner, Mullens and Company, and Senior Government Broker.
- Kenneth Lawrence Holland, C.B.E., Q.F.S.M., H.M. Chief Inspector of Fire Services.
- James Sidney Rawdon Scott-Hopkins, M.E.P. For political and public service.
- George Rowland Jefferson, C.B.E., lately Chairman and Chief Executive, Dynamics Group, British Aerospace. For services to Export.
- Owen Trevor Jones. For political and public service.
- Maxwell Joseph, Chairman, Grand Metropolitan Ltd.
- John Anthony Kershaw, M.C., M.P. For political and public service.
- Professor Frank Ewart Lawton, President, General Dental Council.
- Michael Vincent Levey, M.V.O., Director, The National Gallery.
- Peter Jack Matthews, C.V.O., O.B.E., Q.P.M., Chief Constable, Surrey Constabulary.
- Patrick Michael Meaney, Managing Director and Chief Executive, Thomas Tilling Ltd. For services to Export.
- Professor Desmond Arthur Pond, President, Royal College of Psychiatrists.
- Julian Errington Ridsdale, C.B.E., M.P. For political and public service.
- Stephen James Leake Roberts, Chairman, Milk Marketing Board.
- Charles Russell Sanderson. For political and public service in Scotland.
- Reginald Beaumont Smith, Chairman, George Wimpey Ltd.
- James Douglas Spooner, Chairman, Navy, Army and Air Force Institutes.
- John Ross Stainton, C.B.E., Chairman, British Airways.
- Professor Eric Gardner Turner, C.B.E. For services to scholarship.
- Laurens Jan van der Post, C.B.E. For public services.
- John Stewart Wordie, C.B.E., V.R.D., Chairman, Burnham Primary and Secondary and Burnham Further Education Committees.

Diplomatic Service and Overseas List

- Dermot Renn Davis, O.B.E., Chief Justice, Gibraltar.
- Ian Peter McGillivray Cargill, M.B.E., lately Senior Vice-President, International Bank for Reconstruction and Development, New York.
- Dr John Lewtas Frew, O.B.E. For service to medicine.
- Keith Duncan Macpherson. For service to the newspaper industry.

==== State of Queensland ====
- Alderman Albert Francis Abbott, C.B.E. For service to local government and the Returned Services League.

==== State of Western Australia ====
- The Honourable Justice John Martin Lavan, Senior Puisne Judge of the Supreme Court of Western Australia.

=== Order of the Bath ===
==== Knight Grand Cross of the Order of the Bath (GCB) ====
- Admiral Sir James Eberle, K.C.B.
- General Sir Robert Ford, K.C.B., C.B.E., A.D.C., Gen., Colonel Commandant Royal Armoured Corps, Colonel Commandant Special Air Service Regiment.
- Air Chief Marshal Sir Rex Roe, K.C.B., A.F.C., Royal Air Force.

==== Knight Commander of the Order of the Bath (KCB) ====
- Lieutenant General Nigel Thomas Bagnall, C.V.O., M.C., late 4th/7th Royal Dragoon Guards.
- Vice Admiral Lindsay Sutherland Bryson.
- Acting Air Marshal David Brownrigg Craig, C.B., O.B.E., Royal Air Force.
- Acting Air Marshal John Bagot Curtiss, C.B., Royal Air Force.
- Lieutenant General Roland Kelvin Guy, C.B.E., D.S.O., late The Royal Green Jackets.
- Lieutenant General Thomas Lovett Morony, O.B.E., Colonel Commandant Royal Regiment of Artillery.
- Geoffrey John Otton, C.B., Second Permanent Secretary, Department of Health and Social Security.

==== Companion of the Order of the Bath (CB) ====
Military Division

Royal Navy

- Rear Admiral Gwynedd Idris Pritchard.
- Rear Admiral Martin La Touche Wemyss.
- Rear Admiral William Duncan Lang.
- Rear Admiral William Angus Waddell, O.B.E.
- Rear Admiral Paul Eric Bass.

Army

- Major General David Boyd Alexander-Sinclair, late The Royal Green Jackets.
- Major General Robert Noel Evans, Q.H.P., late Royal Army Medical Corps.
- Major General Andrew Patrick Withy MacLellan, M.B.E., late Coldstream Guards (Now RARO),
- Major General Peter Daer Reid, late The Blues and Royals (Royal Horse Guards and 1st Dragoons).
- Major General Andrew Linton Watson, late The Black Watch (Royal Highland Regiment).
- Major General John Brooker Willis, late 10th Royal Hussars (Prince of Wales's Own).

Royal Air Force

- Air Vice-Marshal John Geoffrey Genior Beddoes, Royal Air Force.
- Air Vice-Marshal Eric Clive Dunn, B.E.M., Royal Air Force.
- Air Vice-Marshal Derek Ive O'Hara, Royal Air Force.
- Air Vice-Marshal John Matthias Dobson Sutton, Royal Air Force.

Civil Division

- John Anson, Deputy Secretary, HM Treasury.
- Clifford Bamfield, lately Under Secretary, Civil Service Department.
- Robert Lane Bayne-Powell, Senior Registrar, Family Division, High Court of Justice.
- Paul Rodney Billett, Under Secretary, Exchequer and Audit Department.
- Anthony John Edward Brennan, Deputy Secretary, Home Office.
- Percy Douglas Davies, Under Secretary, Department of the Environment.
- Paul Dean, Director, National Physical Laboratory, Department of Industry.
- Colin Cunningham Fielding, Deputy Chief of Defence Procurement: Director, Atomic Weapons Research Establishment, Ministry of Defence.
- Gillian Rachel Ford, Deputy Chief Medical Officer, Department of Health and Social Security.
- Gordon Edward Gammie, Legal Adviser, Ministry of Agriculture Fisheries and Food.
- James Edgar Hannigan, Deputy Secretary, Department of Transport.
- Edmund Leslie Harris, Deputy Chief Medical Officer, Department of Health and Social Security.
- William Myles Knighton, Deputy Secretary, Department of Trade.
- Henry Butler McKenzie Johnston, Under Secretary, Office of the Parliamentary Commissioner for Administration.
- Richard Anthony Lloyd Jones, Deputy Secretary, Welsh Office.
- William Kennedy Reid, Deputy Secretary, Scottish Office.
- Andrew Smart, Director, Royal Signals and Radar Establishment, Ministry of Defence.
- Cyril George Ware, Under Secretary, Board of Inland Revenue.

===== State of Victoria =====
- Dr Eric Ernest Westbrook. For public service.

=== Order of St Michael and St George ===
==== Knight Grand Cross of the Order of St Michael and St George (GCMG) ====
- Sir Oliver Wright, G.C.V.O., K.C.M.G., D.S.C., H.M. Ambassador, Bonn.

==== Knight Commander of the Order of St Michael and St George (KCMG) ====
- Mervyn Brown, C.M.G., O.B.E., British High Commissioner, Lagos.
- Albert James Macqueen Craig, C.M.G., H.M. Ambassador, Jedda.
- The Right Honourable Richard John, Baron Moran, C.M.G., H.M. Ambassador, Lisbon.
- Reginald Louis Secondé, C.M.G., C.V.O., H.M. Ambassador, Caracas.

==== Companion of the Order of St Michael and St George (CMG) ====
- Donald George Allen, lately Foreign and Commonwealth Office.
- Thomas Brunton Beattie, O.B.E., Counsellor, H.M. Embassy, Rome.
- Rodric Quentin Braithwaite, Foreign and Commonwealth Office.
- Fred Burrows, lately Counsellor, Office of the United Kingdom Permanent Representative to the European Community, Brussels.
- John Michael Edes, H.M. Ambassador, Tripoli.
- David Hugh Alexander Hannay, Foreign and Commonwealth Office.
- John Rodney Johnson, British High Commissioner, Lusaka.
- William Peters, M.V.O., British High Commissioner, Lilongwe.
- John Michael Owen Snodgrass, H.M. Ambassador, Kinshasa.
- Richard Gilbert Tallboys, O.B.E., H.M. Consul-General, Houston.
- George Gordon Harvey Walden, Foreign and Commonwealth Office.
- John William White, lately Director, Institut Laue-Langevin.
- William John Antony Wilberforce, Foreign and Commonwealth Office.

===== State of Victoria =====
- Neil Andrew Smith. For public service.

===== State of Queensland =====
- Henry Alfred Gordon. For service to journalism.

=== Royal Victorian Order ===
==== Knight Grand Cross of the Royal Victorian Order (GCVO) ====
- Lieutenant Colonel Sir Martin John Gilliat, K.C.V.O., M.B.E.
- Lieutenant Colonel Sir Eric Charles William Mackenzie Penn, K.C.V.O., O.B.E., M.C.

==== Knight Commander of the Royal Victorian Order (KCVO) ====
- Hugh Evelyn Lockhart-Mummery.
- Lieutenant Colonel Peter Francis Thorne, C.B.E.
- Walter John George Verco, C.V.O.

==== Commander of the Royal Victorian Order (CVO) ====
- Henry William Dean.
- Vice Admiral Sir Edward Gerard Napier Mansfield, K.B.E.
- Ralph Frederick Dendy Shuffrey.
- Major Charles Michael Smiley.
- The Right Honourable David James George, Baron Windlesham.
- Harold George Young.

==== Member of the Royal Victorian Order, 4th class (MVO) ====
- Major Duncan Ritchie Beat, Scots Guards.
- Jane Elliott, Mrs Benson.
- Major Shane Gabriel Basil Blewitt.
- Captain George Burnet.
- Surgeon Commander James Brian Gornall, Royal Navy.
- Squadron Leader Derek Michael Lovett, Royal Air Force.
- Miss Peggy Theophila Metcalfe, O.B.E.
- Patrick Basil Porter.
- Colonel Arthur Harold Newmarch Reade.
- Donald Ian Scleater.
- David Benjamin John Thompson.

==== Member of the Royal Victorian Order, 5th class (MVO) ====
- Miss Valerie Joan Astell.
- Joseph Edward Coniam.
- Margaret, Mrs Fuller.
- Miss Joan Ethel Kemp.
- Peter Edmund Knight.

=== Royal Victorian Medal (RVM) ===
==== Royal Victorian Medal (Gold) ====
- Alfred James Amos, R.V.M.

==== Royal Victorian Medal (Silver) ====
- Flight Sergeant Graham Rodney Catherall, Royal Air Force.
- John Colpitts.
- Chief Petty Officer Stores Accountant Henry Edward Comlay.
- Chief Technician Michael John Copland, Royal Air Force.
- Alan Cecil Cowdrey.
- Police Constable William Crawford Donaldson, Metropolitan Police.
- Miss Pamela Mary Donoghue.
- Victor Earley.
- Frank Ennis.
- Norman Gaughan.
- Desmond Harold Lumley.
- James Leslie Pollard.
- Chief Petty Officer (Seaman) William Roy Tatlow.
- Divisional Sergeant-Major Ronald James Tyacke, The Queen's Bodyguard of the Yeomen of the Guard.

=== Companion of Honour ===
- Victor Pasmore, C.B.E. Artist.

=== Order of the British Empire ===
==== Dame Commander of the Order of the British Empire (DBE) ====
- Mary Patricia, Mrs Bridges. For political and public service in the Western Area.
- Betty Fraser Ross, Mrs Paterson, C.B.E., D.L., Chairman, North West Thames Regional Health Authority.
- Miss Shelagh Marjorie Roberts, M.E.P. For political and public service in the Greater London Area,

===== State of Victoria =====
- Dr Margaret Blackwood, M.B.E. For service to education.

==== Commander of the Order of the British Empire (CBE) ====
Military Division

- Rear Admiral John Hood.
- Commodore Geoffrey Douglas Trist, A.D.C., Royal Navy.
- Captain Keith Vere Hadow, A.D.C., Royal Navy.
- Captain Arthur Robert Ward, A.D.C., Royal Navy.
- Brigadier Derrick Peter Ballard (407696), late Corps of Royal Electrical and Mechanical Engineers.
- Colonel Patrick Desmond Blyth (393078), late The Royal Anglian Regiment (Now RARO).
- Brigadier Peter Christopher Bowser (403613), late Royal Corps of Transport.
- Colonel John Ralph Cornell (420805), late The Royal Green Jackets.
- Brigadier Robert William Allan Lonsdale (373904), late Corps of Royal Electrical and Mechanical Engineers (Now RARO).
- Brigadier Thomas Sampson, M.B.E (387845), Army Catering Corps.
- Brigadier John Geoffrey Starling (361898), M.B.E., M.C., A.D.C., late The Parachute Regiment.
- Air Commodore Raymond John Davenport, A.F.C., Royal Air Force.
- Air Commodore John Barry Duxbury, M.B.E., Royal Air Force.
- Group Captain Richard John Kemball, Royal Air Force.
- Group Captain Michael John Wells Lee, Royal Air Force.

Civil Division

- Frederick Joseph Adams, Director of Education, South Glamorgan.
- Kingsley William Amis, Author.
- David Roger Griffith Andrews, Executive Vice Chairman, British Leyland Ltd. For services to Export.
- Arthur Bowden Askey, O.B.E., Entertainer.
- Arthur John Baker, Principal, Brockenhurst Sixth Form College, Hampshire.
- Elizabeth Jean, Mrs Balfour, Chairman, Countryside Commission for Scotland.
- Donald Eric Baptiste, Assistant Secretary, Home Office.
- Richard Stanley Barratt, Q.P.M., H.M. Inspector of Constabulary.
- John Bernard Adie Barton, Associate Director, Royal Shakespeare Company.
- Donald Roy Berridge, Chairman, South of Scotland Electricity Board.
- David Guy Brandrick, Secretary, National Coal Board.
- Charles Edward Bainbridge Brett, Chairman, Northern Ireland Housing Executive.
- Joyce Mary Brewster, lately Assistant Secretary, Lord Chancellor's Department.
- Michael George Brock, Historian. Warden, Nuffield College, University of Oxford.
- Percy James Butler, Director, Mersey Docks and Harbour Company.
- Keith Stanley Carmichael. For political service.
- Colonel Alfred John Chaston, O.B.E., M.C., T.D., D.L., Chairman, Wales, Territorial Auxiliary and Volunteer Reserve Association.
- John Belford Wilson Christie, Sheriff of Tayside, Central and Fife.
- John Arthur Gordon Coates, D.F.C., Consultant, Confederation of British Industry.
- Michael John Cobham, Chairman and Chief Executive, Flight Refuelling Ltd. For services to Export.
- Oscar Henry Colburn, Farmer, Northleach, Gloucestershire.
- Brian Harry Cousins, Assistant Secretary, Ministry of Defence.
- Patrick James Custis, Group Finance Director, Guest Keen & Nettlefolds Ltd. For services to Export.
- Professor Geoffrey Sharman Dawes, Director, Nuffield Institute for Medical Research, University of Oxford.
- James Gordon Dawson, Chairman, The Zenith Carburetter Company Ltd.
- Donald Fothergill Dean, Director, North Western Road Construction Unit, Department of Transport.
- William McFarlane Dermit, Senior Principal Inspector of Taxes, Board of Inland Revenue.
- Geoffrey Ayrton Drain, General Secretary, National and Local Government Officers' Association. Chairman, Paper and Board Sector Working Party.
- Robert Arthur Eden, lately Assistant Director, Scotland, Institute of Geological Sciences.
- Robin Anthony Edwards, lately President, Law Society of Scotland.
- William Edward Fitzsimmons, lately Assistant Secretary, Department of Energy.
- Arthur Godfrey Flavell, Assistant Solicitor, Office of Director of Public Prosecutions.
- Trevor James Fletcher, Staff Inspector, Department of Education and Science.
- Paul Herzberg Frankel, President, Petroleum Economics Ltd.
- Edward Frizzell, Q.P.M., H.M. Chief Inspector of Constabulary for Scotland.
- Colonel William Henry Gerard Leigh, M.V.O., Chairman, National Council, Young Men's Christian Association.
- John Henry Gerrard, O.B.E., M.C., Q.P.M., Assistant Commissioner, Metropolitan Police.
- Matthew Dean Goodwin, Chairman, Hewden Stuart Plant Ltd., Glasgow.
- Stuart Twentyman Graham, D.F.C., Director and Chief General Manager, Midland Bank Ltd.
- Patrick Joseph Grant, Second Legislative Draftsman, Department of Finance, Northern Ireland.
- Leslie Alfred Green, Chairman, International Stores Ltd.
- Ronald Greenwood, Manager, England Association Football Team.
- Robert Guymer. For political and public service, South Eastern Area.
- Basil Eustace Gwyn, M.C., Chairman, National Council of Building Material Producers. Chairman, Cement and Concrete Association.
- Winifred Mary, Lady Hamilton, O.B.E., Chairman, Disabled Living Foundation.
- John Collins Hanscomb, Member, Bolton Metropolitan Borough Council.
- Donald Harrison, Deputy Chief Scientific Officer, Department of Industry.
- James Brown Highgate. For political and public service in Scotland.
- Denys Fraser Hodson, Director, Arts and Recreation, Borough of Thamesdown.
- Sidney Holgate, lately Master, Grey College, University of Durham.
- Michael Holt. For political service, Eastern Area.
- John James. For charitable services in the South West.
- The Very Reverend Ronald Claud Dudley Jasper, Dean of York. Chairman, Church of England Liturgical Commission.
- William Johnstone, lately Chairman, Meat and Livestock Commission.
- Donald Joines, Regional Treasurer, North East Thames Regional Health Authority.
- Derek Rudd-Jones, Director, Glasshouse Crops Research Institute, Agricultural Research Council.
- Harry Kay, Vice-Chancellor, University of Exeter.
- John Lister Kirkpatrick, Co-Chairman, Thomson McLintock and Company, United Kingdom. Senior Partner, Thomson McLintock and Company, Scotland.
- Francis Stephen Law, Chairman, Varta Group.
- David Willmott Livingstone, Deputy Chairman and Managing Director, Albright and Wilson Ltd.
- Miss Margaret Lockwood (Margaret Mary, Mrs Leon), Actress.
- Percy Belgrave Lucas, D.S.O., D.F.C. For services to Sport.
- Sam Lyles, Chairman, Kirklees Area Health Authority.
- John Besley Martin. For political and public service, Western Area.
- Raymond Clive Miquel, Chairman and Managing Director, Arthur Bell and Sons Ltd, Perth.
- Professor Desmond Alan Dill Montgomery, M.B.E. For services to medicine in Northern Ireland.
- Frederick James Moorfoot, Chairman, Kodak Ltd. For services to Export.
- Dawson Moreland. For services to agriculture in Northern Ireland.
- Miss Isabella Helen Mary Muir, Director, Kennedy Institute of Rheumatology.
- Alexander Fyvie Mutch, Convenor, Grampian Regional Council.
- Cyril Arthur John Norton. For political service.
- John Davidson Oakley, D.F.C., Chairman, Australia New Zealand Trade Advisory Committee, and Chairman, British Council, Australia British Trade Association. For services to Export.
- James Keith Rice-Oxley, lately Director, General Council of British Shipping.
- Peter Stanley Paine, D.F.C., Managing Director, Tyne Tees Television Ltd.
- John Howard Parfitt, Chairman, Youth Hostels Association (England & Wales).
- Norman Parkinson, Photographer.
- Tom Alan Phillips, O.B.E., lately Natural Resources Adviser, Commonwealth Development Corporation.
- Christopher Anthony Prendergast, Member, Westminster City Council, and lately Chairman, Location of Offices Bureau.
- Peter David Storie-Pugh, M.B.E., M.C., T.D., D.L., Lecturer in Veterinary Medicine, University of Cambridge.
- John Bertram Redman, Chief Executive and Deputy Chairman, Electrolux Group in the United Kingdom. For services to Export.
- Lieutenant Colonel Basil Edward Rhodes, O.B.E., T.D., D.L. For political and public services, Yorkshire Area.
- Gwenneth Margaret Rickus, Director of Education, London Borough of Brent.
- Lucie, Mrs Rie, O.B.E., Potter.
- Leonard Keith Robinson, Chief Executive, Hampshire County Council.
- Terence Harwood Roche. For political and public service in Wales.
- Angela Claire Rosemary, Mrs Rumbold, lately Chairman, Council of Local Education Authorities.
- Eric Colin Sayers, Chairman, Duport Ltd.
- Alan Gordon Senior, lately Director, WS Atkins and Partners.
- Gavin Brown Shaw, Consultant Physician, Southern General Hospital, Glasgow. Lately President, Royal College of Physicians and Surgeons of Glasgow.
- Robert Irvine Sloan, Executive Director, Commercial Union Assurance Company Ltd.
- Henry Dennistoun Stevenson, lately Chairman, Aycliffe & Peterlee Development Corporation.
- Alfred James Stocks, Chief Executive, City of Liverpool.
- Ralph Conyers Stow, lately Chairman, Council of the Building Societies Association.
- Peter Geoffrey Swann, O.B.E., Director of Medical Services, Esso Europe Incorporated. For services to Occupational Medicine.
- Vilem Tausky, Conductor. Director of Opera, Guildhall School of Music.
- Arthur Alexander Todd. For political service.
- John Stanley Tomkinson, Obstetric and Gynaecological Surgeon, Queen Charlotte's Maternity Hospital, Guy's Hospital and Chelsea Hospital for Women, London.
- Frederick Tye, Director, North West Educational Management Centre, Padgate College of Higher Education, Warrington.
- Sheila Mosley, Mrs Walker, lately Chief Commissioner, Girl Guides Association.
- George Hugh Nicholas Seton-Watson, Professor of Russian History, School of Slavonic and Eastern European Studies, University of London.
- John Cecil Weeks, H.M. Chief Agricultural Inspector and Director, Health and Safety in Agriculture, Department of Employment.
- Neil Gowanloch Westbrook. For political and public service, North Western Area.
- Desmond Gilbert John Wilkey, D.S.C., V.R.D., Chairman, North Eastern Postal Board, Post Office.
- Professor Glanmor Williams. For public service in Wales.
- Stanley John Wilson, Managing Director and Chief Executive, The Burmah Oil Company Ltd.

Diplomatic Service and Overseas List

- The Most Reverend Donald Seymour Arden, lately Archbishop of Central Africa.
- Hugh Catchpole, O.B.E. For services to the teaching of English in Pakistan.
- Gerald David Martin Collett, Q.C., Attorney-General, Bermuda.
- The Reverend Professor Robert Craig. For services, to University Education in Zimbabwe.
- Alan Gregory Elgar, O.B.E., H.M. Consul-General, Cape Town.
- David Gregory Jeaffreson, Secretary for Economic Services, Hong Kong.
- Robert Guy Wilson Lambert. For services to British commercial interests in Switzerland.
- Donald King Middleton, British High Commissioner, Port Moresby.
- Norman Maitland Mims. For services to British commercial interests in Belgium.
- Albert Hugh Reynolds, O.B.E., lately Honorary Legal Adviser, H.M. Embassy, Lisbon.
- Edgar Bruce Ryder. For services to British commercial interests in Liberia.
- James Archibald Bruce Smith, British Council Representative, Indonesia.
- Vernon Ian Webber. For services to British commercial interests in Zambia.
- Dr Haking Wong, O.B.E. For services to commerce in Hong Kong.

===== State of Victoria =====
- Everard Baillieu. For service to the Royal Humane Society of Australasia.
- Francis Henry Rogan. For municipal service.

===== State of Queensland =====
- Charles Lloyd Harris. For public service and service to the sugar industry.
- Dr John Iredale Tonge. For services to health and the community.

===== State of South Australia =====
- Harold Charles Roy Marten. For service to local government and the community.

===== State of Western Australia =====
- Reverend Rabbi Dr Shalom Coleman. For services to youth and education and the Jewish community.

==== Officer of the Order of the British Empire (OBE) ====
Military Division

Royal Navy

- Commander Francis Shand Allfrey, Royal Navy.
- Commander William John Bingham.
- Major Frank Richard Blackah, Royal Marines.
- Commander Joshua George Norman Thomas Cosnett, R.D., Royal Naval Reserve.
- Commander Atwell Gordon Frank Crosbie, Royal Navy.
- Commander Brian Oscar Forbes, Royal Navy.
- Commander Ian Edgar Johnston, Royal Navy.
- Commander Thomas John Kinna, M.B.E., Royal Navy.
- Commander William Harry Edmund Phillimore, Royal Navy.
- Commander Christopher Leonard Salmon, Royal Navy.
- Commander John Aleck Shepley, Royal Navy.

Army

- Lieutenant Colonel (Now Acting Colonel) Anthony Edward Norman Black, Corps of Royal Engineers.
- Lieutenant Colonel William Stanford Godden, Corps of Royal Military Police.
- Lieutenant Colonel Richard Henry Hardie, Royal Army Medical Corps.
- Lieutenant Colonel Bruce Clive Jackman, M.C., 2nd King Edward VII's Own Gurkha Rifles (The Sirmoor Rifles).
- Lieutenant Colonel Herbert Jones, M.B.E., The Parachute Regiment.
- Lieutenant Colonel John Donald Macdonald, Royal Corps of Transport.
- Lieutenant Colonel Christopher Charles Lynwood Owen Owen, M.V.O., The Royal Green Jackets.
- Acting Colonel Arthur Rigby, Army Cadet Force, Territorial Army.
- Lieutenant Colonel Peter William Bowen Scott, Royal Army Medical Corps.
- Lieutenant Colonel Duncan Stewart Shaw, Corps of Royal Engineers (Now RARO).
- Lieutenant Colonel William Hugh Fry Stevens, Wessex Regiment, Territorial Army.
- Lieutenant Colonel Patrick Phillip Dennant Stone, M.B.E., The Royal Anglian Regiment.
- Lieutenant Colonel (Now Acting Colonel) Francis George Sugden, Corps of Royal Engineers.
- Lieutenant Colonel Patrick Watson, Royal Corps of Transport (Now RARO).
- Acting Lieutenant Colonel Thomas Cecil Roy Wetton, Army Cadet Force, Territorial Army.
- Lieutenant Colonel Christopher Cordington Stewart Wright, 1st The Queen's Dragoon Guards.

Royal Air Force

- Acting Group Captain Michael Edwin Williamson, Royal Air Force.
- Wing Commander Brian Russell Barry, Royal Air Force Regiment.
- Wing Commander David Brendon Thomas Birch, Royal Air Force.
- Wing Commander William Henry McCormack Bonner, Royal Air Force (for services with the British Military Advisory Team, Bangladesh).
- Wing Commander George Lionel Grindley, Royal Air Force.
- Wing Commander Terence Frederick Hayward, Royal Air Force.
- Wing Commander Brian Martin Humphries, Royal Air Force.
- Wing Commander John Francis Jarvis, Royal Air Force.
- Wing Commander Christopher Ian Johnson, Royal Air Force.
- Wing Commander Raymond John Peberdy, Royal Air Force.
- Wing Commander James Edward Watts-Phillips, Royal Air Force.
- Wing Commander Brian Neville John Speed, Royal Air Force.

Civil Division

- John George Acton, Senior Inspector, Board of Customs and Excise.
- Evan Leslie Adams, Member, Doncaster Metropolitan Borough Council.
- Robert William Adams, Managing Director, A. H. Mclntosh and Company Ltd., Kirkcaldy.
- Avis Marjorie, Mrs Adlam. For public services in Huntingdon.
- Robert McKee Allison, lately Chief Engineer, Scottish Division, British Steel Corporation.
- Eric Clifford Ambler, Writer.
- Jack Bamber. For services to Horsebreeding and Training, Ballymena, Northern Ireland.
- Peter John Barker, Senior Principal Scientific Officer, Appleton Laboratory, Science Research Council
- James Webster Barty, Secretary, Scottish Law Agents' Society.
- Anthony John Batchelor. For political and public service.
- Sybille, Mrs Bedford, Author.
- Miss Edith Alice Bell, Chief Nursing Officer, Welsh Office.
- George Alexander Peskett Blackburn, Technical Director, Cammell Laird Shipbuilders Ltd.
- Lewis John Bolton, lately Principal, Department of Health and Social Security.
- John Crocket Bowis. For political service.
- John Bradley, Member, Calderdale Metropolitan Borough Council, lately Chairman, Housing Committee, Association of Metropolitan Authorities.
- Archibald Orr Brennan, Director, Edinburgh Tapestry Company,
- Cecil Brown, Diocesan Architect, London.
- Peter Brown. For political and public service. West Midlands Area.
- John Dawson Browne, lately Director, Hogg, Robinson (Government Freight Agents) Ltd.
- Maurice Buck, Q.P.M., Deputy Commandant, Police Staff College.
- Harvey Buckley, Principal Professional Technology Officer, Royal Ordnance Factory, Blackburn, Ministry of Defence.
- Jean, Mrs Burrell, Chairman, Ronaldsway Aircraft Company Ltd., Isle of Man.
- Frederick William Burton, Director-General, International Association of Fish Meal Manufacturers.
- Frank James Butler, Sports Editor, News of the World.
- Miss Violette Marie Caillebotte, Inspector, Board of Inland Revenue.
- Heber Arthur Canavan. For public services in Northern Ireland.
- Maxwell Caplin, Chairman, Hackney and Waltham Forest Disablement Advisory Committee.
- Colonel Philip Herbert Catt, lately Director of Ceremonies, Order of St John.
- James Cattanach, Administrateur, Euromissile Dynamics Group, British Aerospace Dynamics Group. For services to Export.
- Cyril Hugh Charlton, lately Vice-Chairman, Chamber of Coal Traders.
- Gordon Oscar Burland Clarke, T.D., Divisional Manager, Norwich, Eastern Region, British Railways.
- William Harries Clement, M.C., T.D., Secretary, Welsh Rugby Union.
- Douglas Ronald Close, Firemaster, Grampian Fire Brigade.
- James Raymond Cole. For services to medicine in Northern Ireland.
- Hugh Collen, Chief Clerk, Crown and County Courts, Belfast and South Antrim.
- Herbert Comerford, lately General President, National Union of Footwear, Leather and Allied Trades.
- Arthur Holmes Connell, T.D., D.L. For services to the University of Sheffield.
- George Robert Connor, Managing Director, Hall-Thermotank Products Ltd. For services to Export.
- Victor Alexander Cooke, D.L. For services to Industry in Northern Ireland.
- Darrell John Barkwell Copp, General Secretary, Institute of Biology.
- Ivor Arthur Crawley, Chief Librarian, Belfast Education and Library Board.
- Douglas Allan Crockatt, M.B.E., R.D., D.L. For services to the Magistracy in West Yorkshire.
- Alexander Monteith Currie, Secretary, University of Edinburgh.
- Kenneth Haywood Dale, Regional Engineer, Yorkshire Regional Health Authority.
- John Michael Woolliscroft Davis, Chairman and Managing Director, George Woolliscroft and Son Ltd.
- Michael John Day, Chief Probation Officer, West Midlands Probation and After-Care Service.
- John Randall Dickinson, lately Political Editor, Evening News (London).
- Philip Harold Dixon, Chairman, British Limbless Ex-Servicemen's Association.
- Geoffrey Townsend Dobson, Divisional Managing Director, Air Moving Division, Smiths Industries Ltd. For services to Export.
- Isaac Gregg Doran, Consulting Civil and Structural Engineer, Belfast.
- John Hilary Ebbetts, lately President, British Association of Manipulative Medicine.
- Miss Sonia Irene Linda Elkin, M.B.E., Director, Smaller Firms Directorate, Confederation of British Industry.
- Joseph Evans, Chief Salvage Officer, Directorate Marine Services, Ministry of Defence.
- Pamela Mabel, Mrs Fawke. For political and public service, South Eastern Area.
- Margaret Joan, Mrs Fitch. For services to housing in Cambridge.
- William David Flackes, Northern Ireland Political Correspondent, British Broadcasting Corporation.
- Doreen, Mrs Fleming, Vice-Chairman, General Services Committee, Association of District Councils.
- Richard Cawthorne Fletcher, lately Headmaster, Worcester College for the Blind.
- William Alfred Fletcher, Superintending Architect, Department of Education and Science.
- Geoffrey Thomas Bainbridge France, M.C. For political service.
- Miss Marion Frank, Principal, School of Radiography, Middlesex Hospital, Kensington and Chelsea and Westminster Area Health Authority.
- Miss Catherine McGowan Fraser, Head of Department of Health and Nursing Studies, Queen Margaret College, Edinburgh.
- Paul Freeling, Senior Lecturer in General Practice and Head, General Practice Teaching and Research Unit, St George's Hospital Medical School, Tooting.
- Bernard Cardain Frost, D.L. For services to the Scout Association in Buckinghamshire.
- Michael Trevor Fuller, D.S.C., Director, Engineering Employers' Association of South Lancashire, Cheshire and North Wales.
- William Campbell Fulton, Member, Food Standards Committee.
- Thomas Edward Gardiner. For public services in Oxfordshire.
- Professor Alan Robertson Gemmell, Lecturer and Broadcaster.
- Edwin William Henry Gifford. For services to the development of overseas fisheries.
- Jean Brenda, Mrs Gill. For political and public service, North Western Area.
- Miss Sidonie Goossens, M.B.E. (Mrs Millar), Principal Harpist, British Broadcasting Corporation Symphony Orchestra.
- Miss Lucy Gwendoline Duff Grant, President, Guild of St Barnabas for Nurses.
- John Alan Gray, Director of Research, British Gas Corporation.
- Gordon Sheldon Green, Professor of Piano, Royal Academy of Music; Principal Tutor, Royal Northern College of Music.
- Ronald Francis Gridley, Senior Principal, Metropolitan Police Office.
- Allan Norman Grut, President, States of Guernsey Advisory and Finance Committee.
- Bunty Moffat, Mrs Gunn, lately Chairman, Scottish Council for Health Education.
- Joseph Guzzan, Joint Managing Director, Daks-Simpson Ltd.
- Geoffrey Noel Hague, Chairman and Managing Director, Welwyn (Garments) Ltd.
- Denis George Hake, lately Principal, Export Credit Guarantee Department.
- Miss Nora Mary Hanlon, lately Principal Lecturer in Religious Education, Notre Dame College, Liverpool.
- Ivanhoe James Harris. For political and public service in Wales.
- Vera Joyce, Mrs Harris. For political and public Service, Greater London Area.
- Bernard Peter Heaphy, Managing Director, Bovis Construction Ltd.
- Bernard Thomas Henman. For services to the Magistracy in Luton and Bedfordshire.
- Alexander David Macintosh Hilton, T.D., lately Member, Apple and Pear Development Council. Frank Clark Hirst, Principal Librarian, Ministry of Agriculture, Fisheries and Food.
- Fred Ernest Hixon, Refinery Manager, Shell Haven Refinery, Essex.
- Niall Dingwall Hodge. For services to the community in Scotland.
- Charles Holt, Principal, Department of Transport.
- Frederick Wilson Horne, Chairman, Executive Committee, Royal Zoological Society of Scotland.
- Michael Rex Horne, Beyer Professor of Civil Engineering, University of Manchester.
- Gordon Howard. For political and public service, East Midlands Area.
- Ann Christobel, Mrs Wheatley-Hubbard, Farmer, Wiltshire.
- William Howard Lake Hughes, Environmental Health Officer, Department of Health and Social Security.
- George Hull, Principal Collector, Board of Inland Revenue.
- Major Arnold John James, lately Vice-Chairman, South Glamorgan Health Authority.
- Kenneth Merlin David Johns, Chairman and Managing Director, Actair International Ltd, Cardiff.
- Peter Magrath Johns, Secretary, The Lawn Tennis Association.
- William John Jones, lately Principal, Ministry of Defence.
- Gerald Kemp, Administrative Officer, South Belfast District, Eastern Health and Social Services Board.
- George Michael Sinclair Kennedy. For services to Music.
- Patricia, Mrs Lambert, Member, National Consumer Council and Consumer Standards Advisory Committee, British Standards Institution.
- Ralph Augustus Arthur Rustom Lawrence, General Medical Practitioner, Leabrooks, Derbyshire.
- Colonel Charles Anthony La Trobe Leatham, Comptroller, Union Jack Club.
- Kenneth George Lee, Q.P.M., Deputy Chief Constable, South Wales Constabulary.
- Phoebe Margery, Mrs Leslie, Principal, Richmond Adult College, Richmond upon Thames.
- Air Commodore Leslie George Levis, D.L. For services to the Royal British Legion.
- Ronald Lewis, Group Managing Director, G.P.G. International Ltd.
- Norman Paul Lisk, lately Assistant Director / Engineer, Military Vehicles and Engineering Establishment, Ministry of Defence.
- William Niel Brown Loudon, External Affairs Secretary, Royal and Ancient Golf Club, St Andrews.
- The Reverend Donald Macaulay, Convenor, Western Isles Islands Council.
- Miss Doreen McCullough, Chief Nursing Officer, Department, of Health and Social Services, Northern Ireland.
- Alexander Macdonald, Principal, Department of Agriculture and Fisheries for Scotland.
- Donald Alistair Macdonald, Director of Social Work, Borders Regional Council.
- Major Nigel Donald Peter Chamberlayne-Macdonald, M.V.O., D.L., Vice-Chairman, National Association of Boys' Clubs.
- Donald Macmillan, T.D., Director, Nuffield Centre for Health Service Studies, Leeds.
- Amalendu Jyoti Majumdar, Senior Principal Scientific Officer, Department of the Environment.
- Bernard Marcus, Principal Psychologist, H. M. Prison, Grendon.
- Phyllis Rodway, Mrs Bushill-Matthews. For public service in the West Midlands.
- Frank Brian Mercer, President, Netlon Ltd.
- William Eric John Barbour-Mercer, Principal Investigator, Royal Commission on Historical Monuments (England).
- Austin Merrills, Chairman and Chief Executive, Ireland Alloys (Holdings) Ltd.
- Lieutenant Colonel Robert Charles Michael Monteith, M.C., T.D., D.L., Convenor, Clydesdale District Council.
- Michael John Morris Morgan, Director, G.K.N. Contractors Ltd. For services to Export.
- Richard Taylor Morris, lately Senior Principal, Department of Employment.
- William Kerr Morrison, Headmaster, Graeme High School, Falkirk.
- James Munro, Managing Editor, Glasgow Herald.
- John Donald Nisbet, Professor of Education, University of Aberdeen.
- Virginia Fay, Mrs Norris. For political and public service, Northern Area.
- James Sidney Oswald, Chairman, Northumberland County Cricket Club.
- Hubert John Pacey, M.C., Director, Lincolnshire Branch, British Red Cross Society.
- Leslie Harold William Paine, House Governor and Secretary, Bethleni Royal and Maudsley Hospitals, London.
- Kenneth Michael Parry, Secretary, Scottish Council for Post-graduate Medical Education.
- Frank Partington, Chief Fire Officer, Hereford and Worcester Fire Brigade.
- Cyril Irvine Patnick, Member, South Yorkshire County Council, and Sheffield City Council.
- Gertrude Audrey Brenda, Mrs Pawson. For political service, Yorkshire Area.
- Miss Vivienne Bridget Petherick. For political service.
- Edmund George Plucknett, President, National Home Improvement Council.
- Dennis James Pocock, Director, Western Europe, Services Kinema Corporation.
- Miss Janet Mary Powell, Area Inspector, Warwickshire Local Education Authority.
- Simone Ruth, Mrs Prendergast. For political and public service, Greater London Area.
- Lieutenant-Commander Christopher Edward Martin Preston, D.S.C., R.N., (Retd.), Director of Marine Marketing, Rolls-Royce Ltd. For services to Export.
- John Francis Richardson, Professor of Chemical Engineering, University College of Swansea.
- Edward Dunstan Roberts, lately Secretary, Methodist Colleges and Schools.
- Miss Margaret Eryl Roberts, Area Nurse, Child Health Social Service Liaison, Clwyd Health Authority.
- Leonard Henry Rosoman, Artist.
- William Roxburgh, D.F.C., D.L. For political and public service in Scotland.
- Norman Woods Sarsfield, M.C., Secretary, Amateur Swimming Association.
- Neil Thompson Scott, Director, Careers Advisory Service, University of Nottingham.
- Ronald Scott. For services to Jazz Music.
- Kenneth John Vince Shield, Headmaster, Theale Green School, Berkshire.
- William Nelson Shires, lately Chief Commercial Officer, Merseyside and North Wales Electricity Board.
- John Manfred Silbermann, Chairman, Brent Group of Companies Ltd.
- Andrew Kirkaldy Smith, M.C., General Manager, Central Farmers Ltd., Fife.
- Geoffrey Edwin Smith, County Librarian, Leicestershire.
- Peter Alexander Charles Smith, Chairman, British Security Industry Association Ltd.
- Peter Forrest Smith, Senior Partner, A. Smith and Sons.
- James Robert Mitchell Southwood, Director of Engineering, National Nuclear Corporation.
- Maurice George Speed, lately Director of Social Services. Cheshire County Council.
- Charles Richard Stanton, Editor of Debates, House of Lords.
- Henry William Stedman, Chairman, Board of Visitors, H.M. Prison, Gartree.
- William John Steele, lately Headmaster, St Patrick's Secondary School, Bearnageeha, Belfast.
- Cecil Henry Stout, Director of Finance, City of Edinburgh District Council.
- Dennis Francis Strange, lately Deputy General Manager and Chief Finance Officer, Corby Development Corporation.
- Roy Vivian Stroud, Chairman, Wool Industries Research Association.
- Jack Sunderland, Deputy General Manager, Bristol Telephone Area, Post Office.
- Norman Frederick Sussman, Member, Clothing Economic Development Committee.
- William Henry Swan, lately Foreign and Commonwealth Office.
- Ernest Basil Thornton Tanner, Chairman, Detexomat Machinery Ltd. For services to Export.
- Airling Robin Hanbury-Tenison, Chairman, Survival International.
- Irene Agnes, Mrs Thompson, Area Organiser, Northern Region, Women's Royal Voluntary Service.
- Robert Ramsay Veitch, Deputy Chairman, Plant Protection Division, Imperial Chemical Industries Ltd. For services to Export.
- Verdun Cecil Vellacott, lately Treasurer, Gwent County Council.
- Frederick John Walesby, Secretary, Association of Governing Bodies of Public Schools.
- Colin John Shedlock Walker. For political and public service.
- Robert William Wall, Councillor, Bristol City Council.
- Miss Rosalie Muriel Weedon, District Nursing Officer, South Nottingham District, Nottinghamshire Area Health Authority.
- Edward John Westnedge, Director, British Executive Service Overseas.
- Miss Beatrice Brysson Whyte, Director of Nurse Education, Thomas Guy School of Nursing, Lambeth, Southwark and Lewisham Area Health Authority.
- John Wigley, Chief Executive, Royal Welsh Agricultural Society Ltd.
- Richard Harold Wilcox, Director, Industrial Relations, British Railways Board.
- Graham Eric Willett, lately Aviation Underwriter, Orion Insurance Company Ltd.
- Percy John Williams, Restorer I, Tate Gallery.
- Professor Douglass Wise, Director, Institute of Advanced Architectural Studies, University of York.
- James Ernest Frederick Wright, D.F.C. For services to disabled people.
- Austin Yorke Hill. For political and public service, Wessex Area.

Diplomatic Service and Overseas List

- Herbert John Hall Amery. For services to Anglo-Senegalese relations in Dakar.
- Joseph Langley Ayton. For services to British commercial interests in the British community in Swaziland.
- Edmund Fox Barrett, lately First Secretary (Administration), H.M. Embassy, Tehran.
- Richard Edward Beacham. For services to British interests in Papua New Guinea.
- Dr Marjorie Louise Bean, M.B.E. For public services in Bermuda.
- Witold Blaze Jewicz. For services to British commercial interests in Togo.
- Veta Catherine Merren, Mrs Bodden. For public and community services in the Cayman Islands.
- John Locke Blake. For services to the British community in Patagonia.
- David Tresman Caminer. For services to British commercial interests in Luxembourg.
- Miss Edith Brenda Chaplin, M.B.E., lately First Secretary, Office of the Governor, Salisbury.
- Stanley Findlay Thomas Clemenits. For services to British commercial interests in the Sudan.
- Ernest William Job Crawley, First Secretary (Aid), HM Embassy, Jakarta.
- John Davenport. For services to British commercial interests and the British community in Qatar.
- Derek Charles Frederick Hart. For services to English language teaching in Jordan.
- Reginald Frank Ingamells, First Secretary, HQ BAOR, Rheindahlen.
- Piers Jacobs, Registrar General, Hong Kong.
- Richard Arthur Jarvis, British Council Representative, Iraq.
- James Stuart Jolly. For services to the British community in Las Palmas, Canary Islands.
- Dr Keith Leonard Charles Legg, Director of the Polytechnic, Hong Kong.
- Robert Guion Ingledew Leonard. For services to Anglo-Indonesian relations in Jakarta.
- Dr Henry Fook-kuen Li. For public and community services in Hong Kong.
- Edmund George Luff, lately Deputy Executive Secretary, NATO International Staff, Brussels.
- Alan Maley, lately English Language Officer, British Council, France.
- Peter Thomas Moor Q.P.M., C.P.M., Deputy Commissioner of Police, Hong Kong.
- John Scott Nicolson. For services to British commercial interests and the British community in Angola.
- Jack Plant, First Secretary (Administration), HM Embassy, Rome.
- David Trulock Ricks, lately Deputy Representative, British Council, Iran.
- George Warren Shaw, lately British Council Representative, Tanzania.
- John Utrick Sidgwick, Senior Commercial Officer, HM Embassy, Paris.
- Geoffrey Alan Tantum, lately First Secretary, HM Embassy, Amman.
- Donald Henry Thorpe J.P. For public services in St Helena.
- Lewis James Tompsett. For services to British commercial interests in Nigeria.
- William Duncan Alistair Tucker, Director of Water Supplies, Hong Kong.
- Louis Joseph Vasquez J.P. For public services in Gibraltar.
- Brian Lomax Walker M.B.E., Deputy Secretary, Office of the President and Cabinet, Malawi.
- Alfred Francis Ward, Head of Chancery, British High Commission, Suva.
- Stanley Ernest Warder, lately Head of Chancery. HM Embassy, San Jose.
- Joseph Basil Whittington, lately HM Counsel-General, Rotterdam.
- Charles Siu-cho Yeung. For public services in Hong Kong.

===== State of Victoria =====
- Professor Douglas Charles Blood. For service to veterinary science.
- Ernest Frederick Dawes. For service to manufacturing industries.
- Arthur Henry Etherington. For service to business and commerce.
- Dr James Walter Johnstone. For service to medicine.
- Raymond Evenor Lawler. For service to the performing arts.
- William Binns Russell. For service to education.
- Graeme Calderwood Schofield. For service to medicine.
- Dr Rutherford Kaye Scott. For service to medicine.

===== State of Queensland =====
- Dorothy, Mrs Blackborrow. For services to Queensland in London.
- Councillor Edward Owen De Vere. For service to local government.
- Gabrielle, Mrs, Horan. For service to the Queensland Housewives Association.
- James Edward Liu. For service to the Chinese community.
- Councillor Mervyn Huggins McAulay. For service to local government and the community.

===== State of South Australia =====
- Lewis Barrett. For services to accountancy and the community.
- Dr Brian Joseph Shea. For services to psychiatric medicine.
- The Honourable Joyce, Mrs Steele. For public and community service.

===== State of Western Australia =====
- Gordon Campbell Cargeeg. For services to Scouting.
- Peter Arthur Haynes, J.P. For service to the community.
- Patrick Joseph Usher. For service to municipal and community affairs.

==== Member of the Order of the British Empire (MBE) ====
Military Division

- Fleet Chief Petty Officer (COXN) (SM) John Angus, J926189L.
- Lieutenant Commander (SCC) Jack Barling, Royal Naval Reserve.
- Lieutenant Derek Grenville Belson, Royal Navy.
- Warrant Officer II Peter Brown, P020180N, Royal Marines.
- Acting Lieutenant Commander Robert Joseph Christopher, Royal Navy.
- Lieutenant John Gallimore, Royal Navy.
- Fleet Chief Petty Officer (OPS)(S)(SM) Frederick John Hockenhull, J928025M.
- Lieutenant Commander James Benjamin Leach, Royal Navy.
- Lieutenant (CS) George William Low, Royal Navy.
- Lieutenant Commander Gerald Joseph McGeown, Royal Navy.
- Lieutenant Brian Lloyd Miles, Royal Navy.
- Fleet Chief Physical Trainer Kenneth Ogden, J661378J.
- Lieutenant Commander Harry Anthony O'Grady, Royal Navy.
- Lieutenant Commander John Brough Sargent, Royal Navy.
- Warrant Officer I James Paton Strathdee, P013833S, Royal Marines.
- Reverend Ian Nigel Merriott Thompson, Royal Navy.
- Lieutenant Commander James William Anthony Weston, Royal Navy.
- Major (Quartermaster) Thomas Harry Astill, Grenadier Guards.
- Major (Quartermaster) John Arthur Barrow, The Duke of Edinburgh's Royal Regiment (Berkshire and Wiltshire).
- Major Nicholas Howard Glyn Beard, Royal Corps of Transport.
- Major (Queen's Gurkha Officer) Bhimbahadur Gurung, M.V.O., The Queen's Gurkha Engineers.
- Captain Roy Edward Bishop, Corps of Royal Military Police.
- Warrant Officer Class 2 Joseph Alexander Blair, Royal Army Medical Corps, Territorial Army.
- Major (Ordnance Executive Officer) James Edward Bolt, Royal Army Ordnance Corps.
- Warrant Officer Class 2 Stewart Brierley, Royal Army Ordnance Corps.
- Major (Quartermaster) Leslie Mark Burnstin-Wilson, The Queen's Regiment.
- Major (Technical Officer Telecommunications) Michael Butler, Royal Corps of Signals.
- Major Ian Baxter Currier, T.D., Corps of Royal Electrical and Mechanical Engineers, Territorial Army.
- Warrant Officer Class 1 Benjamin Davidson, Royal Tank Regiment.
- Captain (Quartermaster) George Donald, Corps of Royal Engineers.
- Major Terence Bruce Dutton, The Gloucestershire Regiment.
- Major Douglas William Fox, M.C., Army Air Corps.
- Major Malcolm Andrew Gilbertson, Royal Army Ordnance Corps.
- Major Thomas Edward Knight, Royal Corps of Signals, Territorial Army.
- Captain Kwok Tong Cheung, Hong Kong Military Service Corps.
- Major John Hale Lewin, Royal Regiment of Artillery.
- Major Anthony Fergus Sarel Ling, The Queen's Regiment.
- Major (Quartermaster) Sidney Magowan, B.E.M., The Royal Irish Rangers (27th (Inniskilling) 83rd and 87th).
- Major Reginald Hector George McKay, T.D., Royal Army Medical Corps, Territorial Army.
- Acting Major Robert James Alexander Montgomery, Army Cadet Force, Territorial Army.
- Lieutenant (Acting Captain) Raymond William Newell, Royal Regiment of Artillery.
- Major David Nicholas, Royal Corps of Transport.
- Captain (Electrical and Mechanical Officer) Richard Albert Nicholls, Corps of Royal Engineers.
- Major (Now Acting Lieutenant Colonel) Kenyon John A'Court Osman, Corps of Royal Electrical and Mechanical Engineers.
- Captain (Quartermaster) Ernest Edward John Paradine, Royal Regiment of Artillery.
- Major Charles David Maciver Ritchie, The Royal Scots (The Royal Regiment).
- Warrant Officer Class 2 (Acting Warrant Officer Class 1) Anthony Frederick Rogers, Royal Army Pay Corps.
- Warrant Officer Class 2 Graeme Rothwell, Royal Corps of Signals.
- Warrant Officer Class 1 Peter Michael Staniforth, Royal Army Ordnance Corps.
- Acting Major Robert William James Steggles, Army. Cadet Force, Territorial Army.
- Captain Arthur Donald Christopher Stevenson, Intelligence Corps.
- Major John David Slater Stubbs, Corps of Royal Electrical and Mechanical Engineers.
- Major John Campbell Meade Taylor, Corps of Royal Engineers.
- Major Trevor Tegetmeier, T.D., Royal Regiment of Artillery, Territorial Army (now Retired).
- Warrant Officer-Class 1 David William Thomas, Royal Army Pay Corps.
- Major Peter William Tucker, T.D., Royal Army Medical Corps, Territorial Army.
- Major (Quartermaster) Norman Christopher Wilkins, Corps of Royal Engineers.
- Major Timothy Bradbury Winter, Royal Corps of Transport
- Squadron Leader Ralph Edwin Bateman, Royal Air Force.
- Squadron Leader John Howard Channon, Royal Air Force.
- Squadron Leader David John Coward, Royal Air Force.
- Squadron Leader John Clifford Gilbert, Royal Air Force.
- Squadron Leader Patrick Lambert Groombridge, Royal Air Force.
- Squadron Leader William James Horne, Royal Air Force.
- Squadron Leader John Mount King, Royal Air Force.
- Squadron Leader Alistair Cochrane Lang, Royal Air Force.
- Warrant Officer Peter Stewart McKechnie, Royal Air Force (for services with the Royal Brunei Malay Regiment).
- Squadron Leader William Ian Catto Middleton, Royal Air Force.
- Squadron Leader Hilton Henry Moses, Royal Air Force.
- Squadron Leader Frederick William Pike, Royal Air Force.
- Squadron Leader Brian Edward Rowe, Royal Air Force.
- Squadron Leader Ronald Charles Tong, Royal Air Force.
- Squadron Leader Colin Robert Ward, Royal Air Force.
- Acting Squadron Leader Ralph William Reidbuckle, Royal Air Force Volunteer Reserve (Training Branch).
- Acting Squadron Leader John Taylor, Royal Air Force Volunteer Reserve (Training Branch).
- Flight Lieutenant John Edward Jefford, Royal Air Force,
- Flight Lieutenant Robert Anthony Lewis, Royal Air Force (Retired).
- Flight Lieutenant Charles Roger Unwin, Royal Air Force.
- Warrant Officer Denis Frederick Battman, Royal Air Force.
- Warrant Officer Rex John Cundy, Royal Air Force.
- Warrant Officer Robert McGaughey Gibbons, Royal Air Force.
- Warrant Officer John Frederick Parritt, Royal Air Force.
- Master Engineer Anthony Philip Bateson, Royal Air Force.

Civil Division

- William Alexander, Senior Executive Officer, Board of Customs and Excise.
- Thomas James Aley, General Secretary, British Poultry Breeders and Hatcheries Association Ltd.
- Leslie Watson Allan, Manager, Training Services, Vickers Ltd, Engineering Group.
- Captain Ivan Edward Allison. For services to the Sailors' Children's Society in Hull.
- James Alan Allison, Professional and Technology Officer II, Department of the Environment.
- Kai Lars Dalberg-Andersen, Senior Captain, Glenlight Shipping Company.
- David Anderson, Chief Forester, Huntly Forest, East Scotland Conservancy, Forestry Commission.
- Herbert Dawson Anderson. For services to the Magistracy in Cleveland.
- Miss Louise Gibson Annand, lately Education Officer, Schools Museum Service, Glasgow Division, Education Department, Strathclyde Region.
- Frederick Thomas Argent, District Engineer (Maintenance), Southern Gas Region, British Gas Corporation.
- George Evelyn Audley, General Secretary, Association of Art Institutions.
- Miss Helen Elizabeth Awdry. For services to the Orthopaedic Clinic, Devizes.
- Eric Ball, Area Manager, Huston Station, British Rail.
- Kenneth Bamforth, Divisional Nursing Officer (Psychiatry), Liverpool Area Health Authority.
- Miss Joan Maureen Baxter, Editor, Blue Peter Programme, British Broadcasting Corporation.
- John Alfred Bearder, T.D. For services to the community in Halifax.
- Arthur Robert Bell. For Political service, Greater London Area.
- Thomas Bell, Detective Chief Inspector, Royal Ulster Constabulary.
- William Alfred Bell, Area Supplies Officer, Durham Area Health Authority.
- Nancy Catherine, Mrs Bellville. For services to the community in Hereford and Worcester.
- Alan Durrant Bennett, Higher Executive Officer, Home Office.
- George Arthur Charles Bennett. For services to the brick industry in the South East.
- Miss Gwendoline Margaret Berryman, Actress.
- William Bertram, Principal Medical Laboratory Scientific Officer, Monklands District General Hospital, Airdrie, Lanarkshire.
- Miss Bessie Joan Bird, lately Executive Officer, Department of the Environment.
- Frederick Charles Blackmore, Stores Supervisory Officer Grade A, Home Office.
- Christopher John Blamey, Terminal Manager, Container Terminal, Tilbury.
- Ronald George Boarer, M.M., Higher Executive Officer, Ministry of Agriculture, Fisheries and Food.
- Peter Brian Bodycombe, Safety Director, Marketing Division, Conoco Ltd.
- Ronald Thomas Bolton, Higher Executive Officer, Department of Employment.
- Miss Josephine Bradley (Josephine Mary Catherine, Mrs Wellesley Smith). For services to Ballroom Dancing.
- Patrick Walter Brickett, Director of Export Sales, S.B.D. Construction Products Ltd.
- Miss Jane Robinson Bright, Headmistress, Burghclere County Primary School.
- George Levison Bromley, lately Senior Assistant Treasurer, Leicester City Council.
- Jack Ernest Brookes, lately Area Supervising Traffic Examiner, Eastern Traffic Area, Department of Transport.
- Charles Brown, County Emergency Planning Officer, Derbyshire.
- David Brown, Headmaster, Chase Lane County Primary School, Dovercourt.
- Miss Elsie May Brown, lately Head Teacher, Demesne County Infants School, Middleton.
- Eric Raymond Cyril Brown, Director of Financial Services, Rank Precision Industries Limited.
- John Kenneth Brown, Managing Director, AB Electronic Components Ltd.
- Robert Lowe Brown, Chairman, Barrow-in-Furness National Insurance Local Tribunal.
- Murray Caspar Leemi Bruggen, Senior Probation Officer, Lancashire Probation and After-Care Service.
- Miss Elaine Rebecca Bullard. For services to conservation in Orkney.
- Albert Thomas Bullock, lately Professional and Technology Officer II, Ministry of Defence.
- Arthur Bullock, Senior Executive Officer, Department of Health and Social Security.
- Christine Mary, Mrs Bulmer, Secretary, Society of Craftsmen, Hereford.
- William Robert Bulmer, Deputy Chairman, Transport Users' Consultative Committee, North Eastern Area.
- Kenneth Burt, lately Senior Executive Officer, Department of Employment.
- Arthur Jack Bussell. For political and public service, East Midlands Area.
- John William Butcher, Project Group Manager, Marconi Space and Defence Systems Ltd.
- Ernest Callaghan, Station Officer, Fire Authority for Northern Ireland.
- Thomas Patrick Callinan, Divisional Officer, North London and East Anglia Union of Shop, Distributive and Allied Workers.
- John Spencer Canham, Senior Museum Assistant, National Railway Museum, York.
- Miss Brenda Margaret Carmichael. For services to Squash in Scotland.
- Israel Celner, Branch Administrative Officer, Mechanical and Electrical Engineering Department, Greater London Council.
- Francis John Lewis Chantry. For political and public service, Yorkshire Area.
- Brian Kenneth Cheele. For services to the Institute of Builders Merchants.
- Miss Eileen Thomson McLean Clark, Associate Schools and Camps Director, The Scripture Union, Scotland.
- Miss Agnes Clelland, lately Principal Teacher of Mathematics, Lesmahagow High School.
- Albert John Coles. For services to the Royal Naval Benevolent Trust.
- Archibald Paterson Condy, Higher Executive Officer, Department of Health and Social Security.
- Susan, Mrs Cowdy. For services to conservation.
- Samuel John Cox, Area Appeals Organiser, Royal National Institute for the Blind, Stoke-on-Trent.
- Arthur John Coxwell, Secretary, Western Region, Coach and Independent Bus Sector, Confederation of British Road Passenger Transport.
- James Robertson Craig, Staff Officer, Department of the Civil Service for Northern Ireland.
- Henry Craiggs, lately Senior Executive Officer, Department of Employment.
- Reginald Charles Crammer, Controller, Engineering Resources and Security, Rolls-Royce Ltd.
- Robert Crockett, lately Production Manager, Scottish Area, National Coal Board.
- Frank Kenneth Crofts. For services to the Soldiers' and Airmen's Scripture Readers Association.
- Katherine, Mrs Crook, lately Senior Nursing Officer (Occupational Health) Bathgate, British Leyland.
- Niel Cooper Cumine, Sales Supervisor, Far East, Commercial Division, British Steel Corporation. For services to Export.
- Gilbert Barren Dallas, Chief Scientist, British Aluminium Company Ltd.
- Miss Lilian Georgina Darker, Divisional Nursing Officer (Midwifery) Barnet Area Health Authority.
- John Clifford Davies, Station Officer, Gwynedd Fire Brigade.
- Dorothy, Mrs Davis, lately Head Teacher, Firs Schools for Physically Handicapped Children, Smethwick, West Midlands.
- Miss Dorothy Rayner Dawson, Senior Librarian, Rubber and Plastics Research Association of Great Britain.
- Frank Sutherland Dawson. For political and public service, North Western Area.
- Lieutenant Colonel Robert de Bohun Devereux, lately Member, Rushmoor District Council.
- Aimbury Dodwell, Member, Cheltenham Borough Council.
- Miss Eileen Donnelly, Higher Executive Officer, Department for National Savings.
- Cornelius Donovan, Higher Executive Officer, Paymaster General's Office.
- Thomas Riddle Dumble. For political and public service.
- Louise, Mrs Duncan, Director of Administration, League of Safe Drivers.
- Victor Percy Dymock. For services to the Boys' Brigade in Gloucestershire.
- Thomas Earls, Accountant, Northern Ireland Transport Holding Company.
- Miss Margot Elizabeth Eates, Secretary, Advisory Board for Redundant Churches.
- Frank Webb Ellerby, Director, Thomas Scott and Company (Manchester) Ltd.
- Miss Nora Elliott, Director of Housing, North East Fife District Council.
- Miss Margaret Anne Ellis. For services to Women's Hockey.
- Richard George Evans, Higher Executive Officer, Board of Inland Revenue.
- Tudor Evans, Senior Executive Officer, Science Research Council.
- Miss Mary Teresa Fadden, Executive Officer II, Northern Ireland Police Authority.
- Kenneth Harry Fairbotham, Chairman, Fleetwood Fish Merchants Association.
- Miss Gertrude Farmery, Personal Secretary, H.M. Treasury.
- Miss Daphne Muriel Finch, lately Personal Secretary, Vauxhall Motors Ltd,
- Stanley Francis Flowerday, Senior Medical Rehabilitation Officer, Medical Engine Plant, Ford Motor Company Ltd.
- The Reverend Canon Leslie John Forster. For services to the community in Warrington.
- Leonard Thomas Foxwell, Chief Photographer, Westminster Press Ltd.
- Lily, Mrs Friel, lately Member, West Midlands Gas Consumers' Council.
- Laurence Gant. For services to Rugby League Football.
- William Hubert Gardner, Local Director, Contracts, Swan Hunter Shipbuilders Ltd.
- Richard Stanley Garnett, Managing Director, Chamberlain Phipps International Ltd. For services to Export.
- Frederick John Gifford. For services to local government and to the community in Cwmbran.
- Iris Phyllis, Mrs Gillard. For political and public service, Western Area.
- Geoffrey Drew Glanville. For services to young people and particularly to the Sail Training Association.
- Richard Trevor Glanville. For services to young people and particularly to the Sail Training Association.
- Alfred Gleave, Joint Managing Director, Williams and James (Engineers) Ltd. For services to Export.
- Frank Philip Gloyns. For services to Rank Film Laboratories.
- George Frederick Gocher, Chief Designer, Naval Department, Ferranti Instrumentation Ltd.
- Graham Grant. For services to the Newcastle upon Tyne Council for the Disabled.
- Desmond Rothwell Hadfield, lately Senior Executive Officer, Manpower Services Commission, Department of Employment.
- James Hanstock, Inspector (Higher Grade), Board of Inland Revenue.
- Hilda, Mrs Harding. For services to the community in Bollington, Macclesfield.
- Anthony Brian Hooper Harris, Assistant Director, Horticulture Division, National Farmers' Union.
- Frederick Leonard Heath Harris, Chairman, Hampshire Association of Parish Councils.
- John Edwin Harris, Senior Section Head, Fuel and Core Division, Berkeley Nuclear Laboratories,
- Research Division, Central Electricity Generating Board.
- Geoffrey Oliver Harrison, Joint Managing Director, Oughtred and Harrison Ltd.
- George Harrison, Inspector Grade III, Board of Inland Revenue.
- Norman Harvey, Chief Inspector, Cheshire Constabulary.
- Miss Dorothea Elizabeth Hawe, lately Senior Nursing Officer, Ulster Hospital, Dundonald, Belfast.
- Miss Betty Hay, Head Teacher, Caverstede Nursery School, Peterborough.
- Miss Rose Irene Haywood, Export Sales Representative (Steel Section), Brockhouse Export Ltd. For services to Export.
- Captain James Augustus Heavens, Chaplain's Assistant, H.M. Prison, Winchester.
- Georgina, Mrs Henderson, Health Visitor, Dunrossness, Shetland.
- Miss Beatrice Mary Hensman, Senior Administrative Assistant, Bedfordshire County Council.
- Joseph Leo Heppell, Higher Executive Officer, Department of Health and Social Security.
- Miss Mary Hermione Hobhouse, Secretary, Victorian Society.
- Thomas George Holman. For political and public service, North Western Area.
- Hilda Maud, Mrs Holt. For political and public service, West Midlands Area.
- David Royce Howarth, Chief Project Manager, Towed Rapier (Bristol), Bristol Works, Dynamics Group, British Aerospace.
- Maggie May, Mrs Howells. For services to the community in Tenby.
- Clifford Hull, Inspector of Works, Bracknell New Town Development Corporation.
- Kathleen, Mrs Hurley, lately Head of the Home and Hospital Teaching Service, Berkshire.
- Neville Walter Charles Hutchins, Distribution Manager, The Plenty Group. For services to Export.
- Reginald Hutchinson, Inspector, Ministry of Defence Police.
- Miss Phyllis Mary Ireland, lately Archaeological Secretary, National Trust.
- Raymond Solomon Jacobs, Member, Blackpool District Council.
- John Goudie Jamieson, Grading Expert, Aberdeen Fishing Vessel Owners' Association.
- Miss Olga Margaret Jaques, Ward Sister, Bradford Royal Infirmary, Bradford Area Health Authority.
- David Hugh Jenkins, lately Secretary/Personal Assistant, University College of Wales.
- Evan Ifor Jones, Senior Executive Officer, Department of Health and Social Security.
- John Jones, General President, National Union of Domestic Appliance and General Metal Workers.
- John Haydn Jones. For services to the St John Ambulance Brigade in Mid-Glamorgan.
- Marjorie Betty, Mrs Bowen-Jones. For political and public service, Northern Area.
- Sydney Jones, lately Higher Executive Officer, Department of Education and Science.
- Valerie Jean, Mrs Jones. For political service, Eastern Area.
- Marjorie Joan, Mrs Keeble. For political and public service, Eastern Area.
- Robert Hamilton Kenny, lately Divisional Nursing Officer (Mental Illness), Hampshire Area Health Authority.
- Teresa, Mrs Keogh, Health Visitor, South Glamorgan Health Authority.
- Harold Raymond Kernan, Chairman, South Sussex Disablement Advisory Committee.
- Maurice Frank King, Highways Maintenance Engineer, Cambridgeshire County Council.
- William Kirkpatrick, lately Managing Director, Livestock Auction Marts Ltd.
- Thomas Lafferty, Official (Construction Section, Northern Scotland), Amalgamated Union of Engineering Workers.
- Roy Edward Langstone. For political service.
- Raymond John Robert Laverty, Group Controller, Belfast Group, United Kingdom Warning and Monitoring Organisation.
- John Bainbridge Layton, Works Officer, North of England Territorial Auxiliary and Volunteer Reserve Association.
- Kee-hqi Lee, Higher Executive Officer, Department of the Environment.
- Miss Mavis Laura Lee, Higher Executive Officer, Ministry of Defence.
- Robert Lennox. For services to the Glasgow Celtic Football Club.
- Peggy, Mrs Leon (Joyce Peggy, Mrs Pievsky), formerly Controller for Scotland, United Nations Children's Fund.
- Ronald Kingsley Le Rossignol, lately Higher Executive Officer, Board of Inland Revenue.
- Miss Joan Maureen Lewis (Mrs Moor), Managing Director, A. Lewis (Airlok) Ltd.
- Joyce Marjorie, Mrs Lewis. For services to the community in Fishguard and District.
- John Joseph Liddy, Higher Executive Officer, Department of Health and Social Security.
- Heinz-Josef Lobenstein, Member, Hackney Borough Council.
- Albert Edward Lofthouse, Member, Wakefield City Council.
- Peter Richard Lovell, President, Hull Fish Trades Boys' Club.
- Miss Margaret Mary Lynch, Headteacher, Senacre High School, Maidstone.
- James Shackleton McAra, lately District Linen Services Manager, Lothian Health Board.
- Thomas McCalmont, Co-ordinating Officer for the Construction Industry (Scotland), Transport and General Workers' Union.
- John Wallace McDougall, Detective Chief Superintendent, Strathclyde Police.
- George Wamock McDowell, Head of Department of Mechanical and Civil Engineering, Stow College of Engineering, Glasgow.
- Andrew Cyril McElhinney, Chairman, Craigavon Area Council for Aid to refugees.
- Donald Reid McIntyre, Sheep Farmer, Kirriemuir, Angus.
- John McInulty, lately Principal Cellist, British Broadcasting Corporation Scottish Symphony Orchestra.
- Norman Patrick Mackay, lately General Medical Practitioner, Bellshill, Lanarkshire.
- Miss Kathleen McKeown, lately Community Sister (Psychiatric Nursing), Essex Area Health Authority.
- Winifred Dorothy Marion, Mrs Mackrill. For services to the community in New Barnet.
- Eleanor Annie, Mrs McLeod, County Organiser, Hertfordshire, Women's Royal Voluntary Service.
- Katharine Margaret, Mrs McMeekin, Organiser, Belfast Girls' Club Union.
- Ruth Irene, Mrs Maggs. For political and public service, South Eastern Area.
- Raymond Edwin Mannings, Assistant Principal Careers Officer, Berkshire.
- Richard Francis Martyr, lately Principal, Pershore College of Horticulture.
- Miss Daisy Birkett Mason, Senior Investigator,
- Department of Health and Social Security.
- Kenneth Meadows. For services to overseas journalism.
- William Albert Meddle, lately Executive Officer, Department of Industry.
- Christopher Lings Metcalfe, Director, Telecommunication Engineering and Manufacturing Association. For services to Export.
- Miss Katherine Lano Miles, President, Association of Pharmacy Technicians.
- Walter Frederick Millard, (Secretary, Tyndale Baptist Church (Bristol) Housing Association Ltd.
- Gertrude Elizabeth, Mrs, Mills, Member, Wyre Forest District Council.
- Miss Vera Betty Mines, Senior Executive Officer, Board of Customs and Excise.
- Raymond Geoffrey Monbiot. For political and public service, Wessex Area.
- Miss Mary Sarah Moran, lately Executive Officer, Department of Health and Social Security.
- George Will Morrison, General Medical Practitioner, Montrose.
- James Alfred Murphy, lately Chairman, Burnage Community Association.
- James Murray, Secretary, Federation of Ayrshire Community Associations.
- Miss Ellis Margaret Muter Napier, Chairman, Dumbarton Post Office Advisory Committee.
- Mary Naomi, Mrs Nicholls, Member, Tayside Health Board.
- William Oldroyd. For services to the National Westminster Group Pensioners' Association.
- Fred Openshaw. For services to the community in Barnet.
- John Telford Owen, lately Professional and Technology Officer I, Ministry of Defence.
- Owen Morris Owen. For services to local government and music in the Ceredigion area.
- Miss Eleanor Rees Parry, lately, Matron, Machynlleth Chest Hospital, Powys.
- Kerr Patterson, Superintendent, Royal Ulster Constabulary.
- Miss Mary Pattison, lately Senior Nursing Officer (Community), South West Durham Health District, Durham Area Health Authority.
- James Stuart Harrison Paul, Managing Director, Robert Glew Yarn Exports Ltd. For services to Export.
- Captain David Irving Jardine Payne, Master, Esso Petroleum Company Ltd.
- Leon Pears, Senior Executive Officer, Board of Inland Revenue.
- Francis Herbert Petfield, Inspector, South Yorkshire Police.
- John Stanley Pocock, Assistant Director (Operations), Thames Water Authority.
- Richard John Potter, Sales Director, Vosper Thornycroft (UK) Ltd. For services to Export.
- Margaret Ann, Mrs Price. For services to Paraplegic Sport.
- James Frederick Priday, Higher Executive Officer, Ministry of Defence.
- Leslie John Prince, lately Professional and Technology Officer II, Ministry of Defence.
- Elsie Lilian, Mrs Prodham. For political and public service, Greater London Area.
- Raymond Mervyn William Radford, Commander, Metropolitan Police.
- John George Rae, Director, Shetland Silvercraft (J. G. Rae Ltd.).
- Miss Margaret Raybould, Staff Officer, Department of the Environment for Northern Ireland.
- Keith Reginald Rea, D.F.M., Commissioner, Toc H Services Clubs in Germany. Chairman, Council for Voluntary Welfare Work, British Army of the Rhine.
- George Eric Readle, Deputy Secretary, Football League Ltd.
- Miss Betty Lavinia Reeves, Executive Officer, Welsh Office.
- Joseph Reid, Fishery Officer, Department of Agriculture and Fisheries for Scotland.
- Sidney Richards, Senior Executive Officer, Board of Inland Revenue.
- Thomas Morgan Richards. For services to agriculture in Wales.
- John Alan Richardson, Member, Northern Regional Council for Sport and Recreation.
- Lloyd George Richardson. For services to youth in Guildford.
- Peter Rintoul, E.R.D., lately Letting Manager, Estates and Environment Directorate, Scottish Development Agency.
- Miss Lottie Helena Rose Roberts, lately Senior Executive Officer, Overseas Development Administration.
- Jean, Mrs Robson, Senior Medical Officer (Audiology), Lancashire Area Health Authority.
- Ann, Mrs Rockall, Borough Organiser, London Borough of Wandsworth, Women's Royal Voluntary Service.
- Cecil Edwin Ross, Senior Detached Youth Worker, Tooting Project.
- Eric Wilfred Roubaud, Technical Director, M. B. Metals Ltd.
- Miss Margaret Routledge, Headmistress, St Luke's Primary School, London, E.C.4.
- Miss Mary Virginia Royds, lately Deputy General Secretary, National Federation of Women's Institutes.
- Miss Joan Mercédès Russell, Senior Tutor and Head of Dance Division, Worcester College of Higher Education.
- Kartar Singh Sandhu, General Secretary, Sikh Education Council, Leicester.
- John Ernest Sawyer, Hotel Manager, Cunard Line Limited.
- Robert Edmund Scott, Foreign and Commonwealth Office.
- Roy Scott, Plant and Transport Officer, Rivers Division, Yorkshire Water Authority.
- Miss Vivienne Meredith Scott. For services to the Community in Belfast.
- John Edward Sellick. For services to road safety.
- Thomas Senior, Chairman, Skegness Disablement Advisory Committee.
- Miss Faith Maureen Seward, Secretary, North Yorkshire Spina Bifida Association.
- Francis Edward Shields, General Secretary and Treasurer, National Federation of Young Farmers' Clubs.
- Douglas Horace Shoulder, lately Air Traffic Control Assistant I, Civil Aviation Authority College of Air Traffic Control.
- Thomas Whitney Shuttleworth, Station Officer, West Yorkshire Fire Brigade.
- Miss Jeanie Irvine Sim. For services to the Girl Guides Association in Stirling.
- Miss Janet Craig Sinclair, Vice-President, Forth Valley Branch, British Red Cross Society.
- Norman Slipper. For political service.
- Miss Florence Patricia Sloane, Area Secretary, Northern Ireland Women's Section, Royal British Legion.
- Charles Roland Smith, lately Senior Industrial Relations Officer, Department of Employment.
- David Leonard Smith, Inspector, Sussex Police.
- George Clement Smith, Senior Executive Officer, Department of Health and Social Security.
- Glyn Ewart Smith, Assistant Manager, Three Quays Marine Services, Peninsular and Oriental Steam Navigation Company.
- Harold Fyfe Smith, Councillor, Strathclyde Region.
- The Reverend Josiah James Smith. For services to the David Livingstone Club for Handicapped Young People, Harlow.
- Kenneth Henry Smith, Safety Officer, Nacton Works, Crane Ltd.
- Francis Soos, Associate Director, Badalex Ltd. For services to Export.
- Robert Victor Sparrow, Member, St Albans District Council.
- George Kenneth Spence, Manager, Dungannon Branch, Ulster Bank Ltd.
- Richard Arthur Springall, lately Administrator, St Helier Hospital, Merton, Sutton and Wandsworth Area Health Authority.
- Arthur James Staley, Secretary, National Freight Company Ltd.
- Miss Phyllis Standish, lately Divisional Nursing Officer (Midwifery), Wigan Area Health Authority.
- Wolfe Walter Stanton, lately Headmaster, Hasmonean Grammar School for Boys, Hendon.
- Daniel Luther Stephens, Conductor, Whitland Male Voice Choir, Dyfed.
- Miss Mary Evelyn Street, Clerical Officer, Surrey Constabulary.
- Frederick Ernest Sunter. For political and public service in Wales.
- Elisabeth Doreen, Mrs Svendsen, Administrator to the Trustees, Donkey Sanctuary and the Slade Centre.
- Miss Christine Mary Swallow. For political and public service, East Midlands Area.
- Geoffrey Fawsitt Taylor. For political service.
- John Taylor, Architect, Marshman Warren Taylor.
- Lilian Patricia, Mrs Taylor, Chairman, All England Netball Association.
- Major Herbert Lewis Seymour Thomas. For services to the Scout Association in Wales.
- Kelvin Skidmore Matthewson Thomas, Conductor, Silver Ring Choir of Bath.
- Robert Thomas, lately Executive Engineer, Chester Telephone Area, Post Office.
- Rosemary Bridget, Mrs Thompson, Regional Officer, British Council.
- Miss Georgina Kathleen Thornton, Matron, South Muskham Prebend Old People's Home, Nottinghamshire County Council.
- Miss Elizabeth Patricia Tibbles, Senior Personal Secretary, Department of Industry.
- Mabel, Mrs Trevorrow. For services to the British Epilepsy Association.
- Miss Ivy Emily Turner, Higher Executive Officer, Lord Chancellor's Department.
- Derek Leslie Underwood. For services to Cricket.
- Joseph Uttley, lately Traffic Superintendent, Sheffield District, South Yorkshire Passenger Transport Executive.
- John Gerald Vallely, Principal Teacher, Holy Trinity Boys' Primary School, Belfast.
- Robert John Waite, Scientific Officer, Chemical Technology Division, Atomic Energy Research
- Establishment, Harwell, United Kingdom Atomic Energy Authority.
- Miss Esme Betty Dinah Walker, Personal Secretary, Ministry of Defence.
- James Gumming Wallace, Trustee, National Museum of Antiquities of Scotland.
- Lionel John Wallace, T.D., Dental Officer, Corporation of City of London.
- Miss May Walley (Irene May, Mrs Dulson). For services to music in Staffordshire.
- Miss Evelyn Ward. For services to the Wokingham Memorial Orthopaedic Clinic.
- John George Ward, Senior Executive Officer, Ministry of Defence.
- Frederick Henry John Watts, lately Headmaster, Thornhill Middle School, Southampton.
- Cyril Charles Wells, Secretary, Bedfordshire and Hertfordshire Regiment, Bedford Old Comrades Association.
- Oliver Albert Wernham, Higher Executive Officer, Board of Customs and Excise.
- Major Ernest Dudley Weston. For political and public service, West Midlands Area.
- Eric Whitehead, Senior Executive Officer, Department of Health and Social Security.
- William Wilford, Headmaster, Bonner Primary School, Bethnal Green, London.
- George McCallister Wilkinson. For services to the community in Grimsby.
- Alfred Robert Williams, lately Senior Executive Officer, Civil Service Department.
- Cyril John Williams. For services to Industry in Wales.
- Leonard St John Williams, Secretary and Warden, Bristol Guild of the Handicapped.
- Robert Edward Williams, Senior Executive Officer, Ministry of Defence.
- Miss Isabella Muckle Wilson, Higher Executive Officer, H.M. Stationery Office.
- Ethelfleda Daisy, Mrs Winn. For services to the De La Rue Company Ltd.
- Frederick Garnet Withall, Professional and Technology Officer II, Ministry of Defence.
- Miss Eileen Norah Mabel Wittering, Records Officer, Royal Institute of Chartered Surveyors.
- Miss Margaret Rosa Witting, lately Chairman, The Society of Chiropodists.
- Miss Marjorie Alice Wood, lately Nursing Officer, Dundee Limb Fitting Centre.
- Elizabeth Wheen Scovell, Mrs Woodhouse. For services to the community in Oxted and Limpsfield.
- Jane, Mrs Wright, Chairman, League of Friends, Smallwood Hospital, Redditch.
- Erazm Franciszek Ward-Zinski, Sales Marketing Executive, Central Europe, Quest Automation Systems Ltd. For services to Export.
- Tadeusz Jan Zuk, Senior Nursing Officer, Mabledon Hospital, Kent Area Health Authority.

Diplomatic Service and Overseas List

- Miss Mary Allerton, Personal Assistant, British High Commission, Nicosia.
- George Beattie Anderson, Second Secretary (Administration), British High Commission, Kampala.
- Kenneth Bates, Second Secretary (Administration), HM Embassy, Tripoli.
- Ronald Leslie Briant. For services to British commercial interests in Buenos Aires.
- Douglas James Bruce Cahill, lately Attache, HM Embassy, Havana.
- Edmund Ronald John Castle. For services to British interests in Abu Dhabi.
- Brian Charles Cavanagh, lately Vice-Consul, British Vice-Consulate, Winnipeg.
- Wai-shun Chan. For public services in Hong Kong.
- Robert Leonard Close, Third Secretary (Administration), HM Embassy, Kabul.
- Arthur John Corker, Superintendent, Public Works Department, St Helena.
- Jack Dale, Commercial Officer, HM Embassy, Washington.
- Nigel Edwin Davey. For services to British commercial interests in Belgium.
- Arthur Thomas Denyer. For services to the British community in Ostend.
- Miss Monica Enid Dickens. For welfare services to the community in Boston, USA.
- George Orr Duncan. For services to British interests in Saudi Arabia.
- Miss Alice Ivy Durdey. For nursing and welfare services to the community in Cyprus.
- Margery, Mrs Dutta. For services to the British community in Kanpur, India.
- Barbara Mary, Mrs Espenhahn. For welfare services to the deaf in Kenya.
- Margrit Marie Agnes Elly, Mrs Fenton. For services to the British community in Marseilles.
- Miss Bronwen Fitch. For nursing and welfare services to the community in Ipoh, Malaysia.
- Elspeth Griselda Theophila, Mrs Flynn, Editorial Officer, British Information Services, New York.
- Gerald Alwyne Forrest, C.P.M. For services to the British community in Botswana.
- Evelyn Clara, Mrs Fothergill. For services to education in Brunei.
- Dorothy Isabelle, Mrs Fowler. For services to the British community in Madrid.
- Miss Clarice Garnett. For services to education in Ghana.
- Angus Goodwille. For services to the British community in Iran.
- Marguerite Patricia, Mrs Gordon. Chief Commissioner, Girl Guides Association, Hong Kong.
- Stanley Gordon, Permanent Secretary, Chief Minister's Office, British Virgin Islands.
- Miss Bertranne Rosemary Gumbs. For public services in Anguilla.
- Miss Miriam Olga Gumbs. For nursing and welfare services to the community in Anguilla.
- Bernard Halliwell, lately Second Secretary (Commercial), HM Embassy, Peking.
- Jocelyn Hilda, Mrs Henderson. For services to the British community in Abu Dhabi.
- Michael Holmes, Second Secretary and Consul, HM Embassy, Moscow.
- Richard Wingfield Hyde, lately Attaché, Office of the United Kingdom Permanent Representative to the European Community, Brussels.
- Cleavy Astor Jackson, Director, Port Authority, Cayman Islands.
- Ronald Kay, lately Commercial Officer, British High Commission, Kuala Lumpur.
- Miss Irene King. For welfare services to the community in Jerusalem.
- Miss Marjorie King. For nursing and welfare services to the community in the North West Frontier Province, Pakistan.
- Edwin William James Lensh, First Secretary (Development), British High Commission, Dar es Salaam.
- Frank Howard Letty. For services to British commercial interests in Dharan, Saudi Arabia.
- Kwan-hung Li. For community services in Hong Kong.
- Robert Charles Mansfield, lately Attache, HM Embassy, Tehran.
- Alan Frank Mason, lately Director of Public Works, Falkland Islands.
- Neil Lucas Mattin. For services to Technical Co-operation in India.
- Said Hamed Mawly. For services to agricultural development in the Yemen.
- Thelma Lillian, Mrs Mendez Paiva. For services to the British Community in Paraguay.
- Miss Marion Forrest Menzies, lately Personal Assistant, H.M. Embassy, Vientiane.
- Marjorie Gladys, Mrs Morelli, Personal Assistant, Commercial Section, H.M. Embassy, Santiago.
- Wang-yiu Ng, Principal Executive Officer, Government Secretariat, Hong Kong.
- Wentworth Wilmot Nicholls. For services to the community in St Kitts-Nevis.
- Margaret Sau-chung, Mrs O'Hara, Secretary, British Council, Hong Kong.
- Stephen Lawrence O'Meara, lately Vice-Consul, British Consulate-General, Stuttgart.
- Lloyd Trevor Paxton. For services to British interests in Iran.
- Miss Janet Phillips, Personal Assistant, British High Commission, Salisbury.
- Robert George Phillips, Honorary British Consul, Dunkirk.
- Charles Henry Porter, Commercial Officer, British High Commission, Georgetown.
- Laurence John Profit. For services to the community in Bermuda.
- Jack Vernon Puckey. For services to British commercial interests hi Ghana.
- Cyril Howell Rees, M.M. For services to British interests in Bolivia.
- Miguel Castello Rosado. For public services in Belize.
- Walter Graham Rosser, Permanent Secretary, Ministry of Education, Bermuda.
- Miss Jennifer Rothwell. For nursing and welfare services to the community in Guatemala.
- Albert James Slater, Attaché, H.M. Embassy, Tripoli.
- Beryl, Mrs Smith. For services to the British community in Singapore.
- Samuel Eldon Tillett, Commissioner for Labour, Belize.
- Maureen Joan, Mrs Tooke. For welfare services to disabled children in Bahrain.
- Miss Christine Josephine Tucker. For services to education in St Kitts-Nevis.
- Mary Kathleen St Clair, Mrs Walker. For services to the British community in Buenos Aires.
- Miss Sheelagh Ardill Warren. For services to education in Uganda.
- Daniel Gorrie Wilson. For services to British commercial interests in Canada.
- Olive, Mrs Wood, Executive Officer, British Council, Mombasa.
- Miss Patricia Hamilton Wright. For services to the British community in Mallorca.
- Matilda, Mrs Wynn. For nursing and welfare services to the community in Zambia.
- Justin Kwok-hun Yue, Deputy Commissioner for Trade, Hong Kong.

===== State of Victoria =====
- Frances Muriel, Mrs Clack. For community service.
- Arthur James Cunningham. For service to hospital administration.
- Archibald Francis Goodman. For municipal service.
- Arthur Rollet Gross. For municipal service.
- Margaret Gwen, Mrs Hardy. For community service.
- Councillor James Robert Hargreaves. For municipal service.
- Hubert Thomas Hepburne Healy. For municipal service.
- Maurice Edward Kirby. For service to disabled children.
- John Fisher Levick. For municipal service.
- Miss Nancy Winifred Long. For service to nursing.
- Robert Wood Pettitt. For rural and municipal service.
- William Herbert Slade. For service to swimming.

===== State of Queensland =====
- John Ronald Curro. For services to music.
- Miss Margaret Gibson. For services to the community.
- Walter Mervyn Clyde Hoskins. For services to the accountancy profession.
- Kurt Rubbers. For services to the community.
- Francis James Kennedy. For services to the Royal National Agricultural and Industrial Association of Queensland.
- Vernon Alister MacDonald, Q.P.M., Deputy Commissioner of Police.
- Dorothy Maria, Mrs Scheinpflug. For services to the Queensland Country Women's Association.
- John Austin Robert Thompson. For service to Freemasonry and the community.

===== State of South Australia =====
- Marion Musgrave, Mrs De Boehme. For services to children.
- Dr Frederick Geisler. For services to medicine.
- Alan Geoffrey Lillecrapp. For services to local government and the community.
- Zoe, Mrs Lindsay. For services to South Australian trade and industry.
- Keith Alexander MacDonald. For services to the community.
- Geoffrey Douglas Maitland. For services to physiotherapy.
- Marney Alice, Mrs Pearce. For services to the blind.

===== State of Western Australia =====
- Ernest Buckland. For service to the community.
- Alfred George Button. For services to the development of the Esperance district.
- May Emma, Mrs Campbell. For services to hockey.
- Gwendoline Norie, Mrs Foley. For service to the community.

=== Imperial Service Order (ISO) ===
Home Civil Service

- Ralph Bee, lately Farm Director, Drayton Experimental Husbandry Farm, Ministry of Agriculture, Fisheries and Food.
- Denis William Bryer, Principal Scientific Officer, National Maritime Institute, Department of Industry.
- Charles Lawrence Clark, Principal, Department of Industry.
- Walter Harrison Clayton, Senior Principal, Department of Employment.
- Valerie Eveline Beatrice, Mrs Cross, lately Principal, Ministry of Defence.
- Eric Henry Desmond Este, Senior Principal, Ministry of Defence.
- John Hendry, lately Senior Principal, Manpower Services Commission, Department of Employment.
- Denis Thomas Hunt, Principal, Crown Estate Commission.
- Bernard William Jacobs, lately Principal Scientific Officer, Ministry of Defence.
- George Edward Long, lately Principal, Department for National Savings.
- Miss Muriel Joan Loosemore, Senior Principal, Department of Industry.
- John Harland Marshall, M.B.E., lately Principal, Department of Transport.
- John Martin, Principal, Department of Commerce, Northern Ireland.
- Andrew Robert Mitchell, Inspector, Board of Inland Revenue.
- Vivian Edward Arthur Morris, Superintending Valuer, Board of Inland Revenue.
- Laurence Ernest O'Connell, Superintending Mechanical and Electrical Engineer, Department of the Environment.
- Miss Marjorie Frances Osborn, Principal, Cabinet Office.
- Maurice William Sackett, Principal Professional Technology Officer, Ministry of Defence.
- Maurice Clayton Lovaton Simms, lately Senior Principal, Department of Health and Social Security.
- Robert Emmerson Simpson, Principal Scientific Officer, Ministry of Defence.
- Geoffrey Hills Talbot, Principal, Department of Health and Social Security.
- Jack Turnbull, Principal, Board of Inland Revenue.
- Peter Edward White, Superintending Architect, Scottish Development Department.
- George Ernest Winter, lately Principal, Ministry of Agriculture, Fisheries and Food.

Diplomatic Service and Overseas List

- Wa-shek Chan, Assistant Commissioner of Prisons, Hong Kong.
- King-choi Chow, Assistant Commissioner of Inland Revenue, Hong Kong.
- Deric Daniel Waters, Assistant Director of Education, Hong Kong.
- Mang-ki Wong, Principal Government Engineer, Public Works Department, Hong Kong.

==== State of Queensland ====
- Arthur James Peel, Auditor-General. For public service.

==== State of South Australia ====
- Gordon Charles Bruff, Deputy Director-General of Community Welfare.

==== State of Western Australia ====
- Alfred Richard Tomlinson, Chief Executive Officer, Agriculture Protection Board.

=== British Empire Medal (BEM) ===
Military Division

- Chief Marine Engineering Mechanician (M) Richard Leslie Bacon.
- Colour Sergeant John Winston Barwell, Royal Marines.
- Chief Petty Officer Writer Peter Leonard Bradshaw, Royal Naval Reserve.
- Chief Petty Officer (OPS) (M) Jan Stuart Bryce.
- Acting Master at Arms Colin Duke.
- Chief Weapon Electrical Artificer Clive Eades.
- Chief Radio Supervisor (W) John Joseph Fox.
- Chief Marine Engineering Mechanician (P) John Geddes.
- Chief Petty Officer Physical Trainer James Gibson.
- Colour Sergeant Terence John Hayes, Royal Marines.
- Chief Wren Regulating Carolyn Mary Lewin.
- Chief Petty Officer Steward Herbert William John Lovegrove, Royal Naval Reserve.
- Colour Sergeant Matthew Lowe, Royal Marines.
- Chief Petty Officer Physical Trainer Gordon John Mahoney.
- Chief Petty Officer Physical Trainer John Brian May.
- Chief Radio Supervisor Roy Morton, Royal Naval Reserve.
- Chief Marine Engineering Mechanic (M) Derrick Pask.
- Chief Marine Engineering Mechanic (L) Bryn Powell.
- Chief Petty Officer Cook William Michael Rees.
- Colour Sergeant Samuel Raymond Shillito, Royal Marines.
- Marine Engineering Artificer (P)l John Malcolm Stanley.
- Air Electrical Artificer (R)l Thomas Henry Trevor Thomas.
- Chief Petty Officer Airman (PHOT) Charles Herbert Thompson.
- Chief Petty Officer Coxswain (SM) Colin Wain.
- Sergeant Frank Mason Auty, Royal Corps of Transport (Now Discharged).
- Corporal (Acting Sergeant) Gordon Beattie, The King's Own Royal Border Regiment.
- Staff Sergeant Ronald Bell, Corps of Royal Engineers.
- Staff Sergeant Robert Bowrah, Royal Army Ordnance Corps.
- Sergeant (Acting Warrant Officer Class 2) Budhakumar Gurung, 2nd King Edward VII's Own Gurkha Rifles (The Sirmoor Rifles).
- Corporal Eric Charles Button, Royal Corps of Transport.
- Staff Sergeant Neil Clark, Royal Corps of Transport.
- Staff Sergeant Archibald Leonard Herbert Cowlard, The Queen's Regiment, Territorial Army.
- Staff Sergeant Howard James Cutler, Royal Army Ordnance Corps.
- Staff Sergeant Roger Davies, Royal Corps of Transport.
- Staff Sergeant William Arnold Dewhurst, Army Catering Corps.
- Sergeant Dharmaraj Gurung, Queen's Gurkha Signals.
- Staff Sergeant William James Dodds, Royal Corps of Signals.
- Staff Sergeant Stanley Arthur Donkin, The King's Regiment.
- Corporal Ian Geoffrey Ellis, The King's Own Royal Border Regiment.
- Sergeant Graeme Ferguson, Corps of Royal Engineers.
- Private (Acting Sergeant) Mary Rose Francey, Women's Royal Army Corps.
- Sergeant Malcolm Matthew Frid, Royal Corps of Signals (Now Discharged).
- Staff Sergeant John Wight Gray, Corps of Royal Engineers.
- Staff Sergeant Bernard Groves, Corps of Royal Electrical and Mechanical Engineers.
- Staff Sergeant Kenneth William Guntrip, Royal Corps of Transport, Territorial Army.
- Sergeant Herbert William Hamilton, Royal Regiment of Artillery.
- Bombardier James Hargreaves, Royal Regiment of Artillery.
- Staff Sergeant Harkabahadur Gurung, 10th Princess Mary's Own Gurkha Rifles.
- Corporal Robert Henry Hasnip, Army Catering Corps.
- Sergeant Roy Hatch, Royal Army Medical Corps, Territorial Army.
- Corporal James Edward Henning, The Royal Welch Fusiliers, Territorial Army.
- Staff Sergeant Ian Hilton, The Royal Regiment of Fusiliers.
- Staff Sergeant John David Hind, Royal Army Ordnance Corps.
- Staff Sergeant William James Houston, Royal Army Medical Corps.
- Corporal Dian Moreen Keay, Women's Royal Army Corps.
- Sergeant Lawrence Kennedy, Royal Pioneer Corps.
- Staff Sergeant Khembahadur Thapa, 2nd King Edward VII's Own Gurkha Rifles (The Sirmoor Rifles).
- Staff Sergeant (Acting Warrant Officer Class 2) John Walter Knock, Corps of Royal Military Police (now Discharged).
- Staff Sergeant Trevor Lenton, The Royal Anglian Regiment.
- Sergeant Stephen John Macdonald, Royal Corps of Signals.
- Sergeant Ivor William Male, The Royal Hampshire Regiment
- Staff Sergeant Michael Andrew Ralph McSweeny, Royal Tank Regiment.
- Staff Sergeant Nigel Millar, The Royal Hussars (Prince of Wales's Own).
- Private (Acting Sergeant) Janet Louise Moates, Women's Royal Army Corps.
- Staff Sergeant Narbu Sherpa, 7th Duke of Edinburgh's Own Gurkha Rifles.
- Staff Sergeant Brian Page, The King's Own Royal Border Regiment.
- Sergeant Purnabahadur Ldvibu, 7th Duke of Edinburgh's Own Gurkha Rifles.
- Sergeant (Acting Staff Sergeant) Robert William Ralph, Corps of Royal Military Police.
- Staff Sergeant Eric Clifford Rawlings, The Queen's Regiment, Territorial Army.
- Sergeant Jean Kay Raynor, Women's Royal Army Corps.
- Corporal Graham Malcolm. Roberts, Corps of Royal Engineers.
- Lance Corporal (Acting Corporal) William Wynne Roberts, Royal Corps of Signals.
- Sergeant Shamsher Rai, 10th Princess Mary's Own Gurkha Rifles.
- Staff Sergeant Harold Shearer, Scots Guards.
- LS/Staff Sergeant (Local Warrant Officer Class 2) John Shepheard, Royal Regiment of Artillery.
- Staff Sergeant James Maurice Stallerbrass, The Royal Anglian Regiment, Territorial Army.
- Staff Sergeant David Japp Stott, Corps of Royal Engineers.
- Lance Corporal Clifford Frederick Swailes, Royal Corps of Signals.
- Lance Sergeant Samuel David Taylor, Irish Guards.
- Staff Sergeant (Acting Warrant Officer Class 2) Marion Templeman, Women's Royal Army Corps.
- Staff Sergeant Adam Robert Thomson, Queen's Own Highlanders (Seaforth and Camerons).
- Staff Sergeant Stephen Grenville Tucker, Royal Corps of Signals;
- Corporal Bryan Wilkinson, Royal Corps of Transport.
- Corporal Alan Winspear, Army Catering Corps.
- Sergeant David Roy Wisbey, Royal Corps1 of Transport.
- Staff Sergeant Kenneth Sidney Wooden, The Parachute Regiment.
- Flight Sergeant Anthony Ernest Casey, Royal Air Force.
- Flight Sergeant John Balfour Fernie, Royal Air Force.
- Flight Sergeant Raymond William Gadney, Royal Air Force.
- Flight Sergeant Bartholomew Graham, Royal Air Force.
- Flight Sergeant Alan Thomas Johnson, Royal Air Force.
- Flight Sergeant Dennis John McAllister, Royal Air Force.
- Flight Sergeant David Myles, Royal Air Force.
- Flight Sergeant William James Pead, Royal Air Force.
- Flight Sergeant David George Rossant, Royal Air Force.
- Flight Sergeant William Walker, Royal Air Force.
- Chief Technician Bryan Robert Barrington, Royal Air Force.
- Chief Technician David Noel Carter, Royal Air Force.
- Chief Technician Gerald Rodney Coaten, Royal Air Force.
- Chief Technician Roy Cox, Royal Air Force.
- Chief Technician Richard Nordberg, Royal Air Force.
- Chief Technician Graham Noyce, Royal Air Force.
- Sergeant Robert Allan Baker, Royal Air Force.
- Sergeant Lorna Kathleen Flowerdew, Women's Royal Air Force.
- Sergeant Joseph Glanville, Royal Air Force.
- Sergeant Alexander Maurice Sawyer, Royal Air Force.
- Sergeant William Charles Common Steele, Royal Air Force.
- Corporal Charles Alphonsus Hewson, Royal Air Force.

Civil Division

United Kingdom

- Roy Gerald Adams, Warden, Brecon Beacons Mountain Centre.
- Leonard David Ambler, Sub Officer, Hertfordshire Fire Brigade.
- Sydney Leonard William Ash, Marine Services Officer Grade III (Engineer), Ministry of Defence.
- Laura, Mrs Askew, lately Book-keeper, Shirley Aldred and Company Ltd., Worksop.
- Denis Harold Atterbury, Reserve Sergeant, Derbyshire Constabulary.
- Frederick Thomas Baker, lately Leading Hand Gardener, Hampton Court Palace, Department of the Environment.
- Richard Gilbert Baker, Sub Officer, Bedfordshire Fire Brigade.
- Donald Alexander Bambridge, Fireman, Surrey Fire Brigade.
- Kathleen Blanche Mabel, Mrs Barker, Assisting Prison Welfare and Escorts, Avon County, Women's Royal Voluntary Service.
- Molly Catherine, Mrs Barling, Member, Parents and Supporters Association, Hull Unit, Sea Cadet Corps.
- George Thomson Barr, lately Electrician, Ravenscraig Works, Scottish Division, British Steel Corporation.
- Elizabeth Dorothy, Mrs Bell, Chargehand, Welwyn Electric Ltd., Bedlington, Northumberland.
- Ronald Arthur Bird, Museum Warder Grade III, British Museum.
- James Everett Bishop, Assistant Farm Manager, Northamptonshire Agricultural College.
- James Walker Black, lately Process and General Supervisory Grade E, Ministry of Defence.
- Ralph Arthur Blackbourn, Warrant Officer, No. 141 (Boston) Squadron, Air Training Corps.
- Leonard Blackmore. For service to the National Association of Boys' Clubs in the West Midlands.
- Edward Thorn Blain, lately Experimental Worker Grade II, Ministry of Defence.
- Roy Alan Alderston Bolton, Professional and Technology Officer III, Ministry of Defence.
- Reginald Arthur Boyce, lately Sergeant, Leicestershire Constabulary.
- Miss Dorothy Florence Boys, Telephone Switchboard Operator, All Saints Hospital, Kent Area Health Authority.
- Louis Malachy Bradley, Stores Officer Grade D, Ministry of Defence.
- John Bernard Bradnock, Chief Petty Officer Cook, Training Ship Royalist, Sea Cadet Corps.
- James Frederick Bray. For services as a Groundsman.
- Herbert Brookes, Face Worker, Elsecar Colliery, South Yorkshire Area, National Coal Board.
- James Arthur Broughton, Senior Trials Engineer, Military Data Systems Division, Marconi
- Space and Defence Systems Ltd. For services to Export.
- Ronald Albert Aldred Bunce, Foreman (Meter Reading), Halifax District, Yorkshire Electricity Board.
- Albert Edward Burgess, Roundsman, Hayman and Son, Bakers, Ilminster, Somerset.
- Michael Peter Burke, Roll Grinder, Llanwern Works, Welsh Division, British Steel Corporation.
- Frank Burt, Craftsman I, National Physical Laboratory.
- Elizabeth Joan, Mrs Butler. For services to the community in Cambridge.
- Jack Button, Works Convenor, Amalgamated Union of Electrical Workers, Talbot Ltd., Dunstable.
- Harry George Cable, M.M., lately Assistant Keeper, Central Criminal Court.
- James Anderson Campbell, Inspector, Craigneuk Works, British Steel Corporation Holdings.
- Denis David Cannon, Service Technician, Southend, North Thames Region, British Gas Corporation.
- Edward Carson, Driver, Northern Bank Ltd.
- William Robert Carson, Sergeant, Royal Ulster Constabulary.
- William Francis Carter, Station Officer I, H.M. Coastguard, Dover, Department of Trade.
- Miss Doris Hilda Chamberlain, lately Local Organiser, Bullington, Oxon, Women's Royal Voluntary Service.
- Miss Katharine Dorothea Chance. For services to the community in the Hampshire area.
- -Arthur Chapman, Seasonal Warden, Humber Wildfowl Refuge.
- Kenneth Chapman, Senior Messenger, Privy Council Office.
- Robert Arthur Chapman, Senior Show Fitter, Gascoigne Milking Equipment Division, Thomas Tilling Group Ltd.
- Miss Betty Jane Charman, lately Supervisor, Print Room, National Freight Company Ltd.
- Bernard James William Cheesman, Press Operator, Philips Industries Ltd, Croydon.
- Albert Arthur Chesworth, Superintendent, Machine Shop and Toolroom, Brockhouse Forgings Ltd.
- Reginald Albert Victor Childs, Gardener Special (Band 18), Royal Botanic Gardens.
- Gertrude Constable, Mrs Clancy, Leader, Caol Emergency Team, Lochaber, Inverness-shire, Women's Royal Voluntary Service.
- Claire Margaret Eva, Mrs Clark, Centre Organiser, Langport, Somerset Branch, British Red Cross Society.
- Cyril Clay, General Labourer, South Kesteven District Council.
- James Ronald Clay, Chauffeur, West Yorkshire County Council.
- Isabella Rosina Louise, Mrs Coker. For services to the community in Chesterfield and North Derbyshire.
- Kenneth William Cole, Chargehand Electrician, Derby Workshop, British Rail Engineering Ltd.
- Louisa Olive, Mrs Collins, lately Management Caterer, Stevenage New Towns Development Corporation.
- Edward George Congreve, Manager, Service and Transport Department, Chawston Estate, Land Settlement Association Ltd.
- John Connell, Works Convenor, Chadderton, Manchester Division, Aircraft Group, British Aerospace.
- Oswald Patrick Marius Cook, Surveyor Grade 2, Ordnance Survey.
- Ronald Pascoe Cook, Laboratory Mechanic, Ministry of Defence.
- Norman Charles Cooke, Head Groundsman, Epsom Racecourse and Training Gallops.
- Betty Alma, Mrs Corbett, Canteen Manageress, Sutcliffe Catering Company.
- Fred Frank Corless, Youth Leader, Holycroft Youth Club, Keighley.
- Richard Crookshanks, Foreman Grade III, Northern Ireland Housing Executive.
- Gladys Elsie, Mrs, Crosby. For service to the community in Stockton on Tees.
- Alice Beatrice, Mrs Crosland, Health and Hospitals Welfare Organiser, Area 4, North East Division, Women's Royal Voluntary Service.
- William Crow. For service to the community in Gateshead.
- Samuel Darragh, Senior Supervisor, Department of Agriculture for Northern Ireland.
- Ronald Ross Davidson, Chief Petty Officer, Shell Tankers (UK) Ltd.
- Arthur James Davies, lately Sheltered Housing Warden, Habberley, Kidderminster.
- Roy Charles Dawes, Chief Naval Auxiliaryman, Southampton Unit, Royal Naval Auxiliary Service.
- Derek Arthur Charles Dean, Postal Executive C, Head Post Office, Cambridge, The Post Office.
- Denis Richard Dee, Project Engineer, Stelmo Ltd. For services to Export.
- Frank Leslie Dew, Constable, Metropolitan Police.
- Kenneth Charles Dewey, Senior Specialist (Group G), H.M. Stationery Office.
- Jeffrey John Dilnot, Land Drainage Foreman, Kent River and Water Division, Southern Water Authority.
- George David Dixon, Chief Officer Class I, Northern Ireland Prison Service.
- Thomas William Dobbie, Sergeant, Cambridgeshire Constabulary.
- Eleanor Agnes, Mrs Doherty, District Staff, Hospitals, Newport, Women's Royal Voluntary Service.
- Robert Gloag Douglas, Senior Supervisor, Assembly Shop, Bertrams Sciennes Ltd, Edinburgh.
- Archibald Cuthbert Downie, Instructor Grade I, Balgowan School, Dundee.
- Walter Frank Drew, Foreman, Mirror Polishing Department, George Butler of Sheffield Ltd.
- Frederick Driver, Office Keeper, Department of Health and Social Security.
- John Shiells Drummond, Chief Clerk Officer, H.M. Prison, Edinburgh.
- Frederick Bridge Duff, Telephonist, Metropolitan Police.
- Alice, Mrs Duncalf, Caster, Staffordshire Potteries Ltd., Stoke-on-Trent.
- Frederick William Eaves, Sub-Officer, West Midlands Fire Service.
- William Ellis, Leading Ambulanceman, Northern Ireland Ambulance Service.
- Frederick Thomas Elson, Fitter, Wimpey Plant Ltd.
- Eric Etchells, lately Messenger, Ministry of Defence.
- Miss Annie Ruth Evans. For services to the Darby and Joan Senior Citizens club, Barmouth.
- William Stanley Charles Farrow, Training Officer and Assistant, Brooke Marine Ltd.
- Grace Beryl, Mrs Penning, District Coordinator, Hertfordshire Branch, British Red Cross Society.
- Miss Ivy Muriel Finnemore, Line Operator, Ultra Electronic Controls Ltd., Acton.
- Alfred Michael Foard, Transport Manager, Petbow Ltd. For services to Export.
- Hugh Cottier Foster, lately Treasurer, Wigton Pensioners' Association.
- John Frederick William Freeman, Handyman, Cyclotron Unit, Medical Research Council.
- Harold Eric Fuller, Development Worker, Ireland Colliery, North Derbyshire Area, National Coal Board.
- Christina Margaret, Mrs Gair, Secretary, League of Friends, Crichton and Dumfries Royal Infirmary.
- James Albert Garrard, Driver, Ipswich Branch, National Carriers Ltd.
- Charles Edward Sidney Garrett, Reproduction Grade AIII, British Museum (Natural History).
- William Gaskell, Land Drainage Superintendent(Rivers Division), North West Water Authority.
- Edwin George, Senior Ranger I, Wyre Forest, Forestry Commission.
- Joseph William Edward Gibbens, Master, Trinity House Light Vessel Service.
- Robert Gill, Drawbench Operator, BICC Pyrotenax Ltd., Hebbum on Tyne.
- Alexander Gillies, Chargehand Linesman, North of Scotland. Hydro Electric Board.
- Robert James Gilmore, Roads Foreman, Department of Environment for Northern Ireland.
- Joseph Hodgson Glaister, Road Foreman, Cumbria Highway Authority.
- Ronald James Glass, Staff Chargeman, Steels Engineering Ltd., Sunderland.
- Arthur John Godfrey, Head Gardener, Killerton Garden, The National Trust.
- Sydney Jack Gomm, Panel Box Supervisor, Cardiff Western Region, British Rail.
- Miss Ethel Graham, Kitchen Assistant, The Institution of Mechanical Engineers.
- Robert Vernon Carr Grainger, Chief Underground Engineering Supervisor, Hickleton Colliery, Doncaster Area, National Coal Board.
- Elizabeth Charlotte, Mrs Gray, Calendar Operator, Initial Services Ltd., Tooting, London S.W.8.
- Joseph Andrew Hadgkiss, lately Clerk, GEC Avery Export Ltd. For services to Export.
- William Hall. For services to the community in Satley, Bishop Auckland.
- William Donald Buchanan Hall, lately Process and General Supervisory Grade C, Ministry of Defence.
- John Richard Garbutt Halton, Station Officer, Ambulance Service, North Yorkshire Area Health Authority.
- John Byers Hamilton, Chief Officer Class I, Scottish Prison Service,
- Norman Victor Harding. For services to Bell-ringing.
- Albert William Hards. For services to the Royal British Legion.
- Mortimer Harrington, Porter, Ash Vale Station, British Rail.
- John Albert Hart, Development and Training Officer, Agricultural Division, Imperial Chemical Industries Ltd.
- Patrick Hayes, Schoolkeeper, Kidbrooke Comprehensive School, Inner London Education Authority.
- Miss Ann Eileen Hogben, lately Sergeant, Metropolitan Police.
- John Paterson Horner, Drainage Supervisor* Plymouth City Council.
- John Wallace Groome Howes, Constable, Dorset Police.
- Henry Thomas Hudson. For service to the St Ives Youth Club.
- Charles Hunt, lately Joinery Supervisor, Smiths Dock, British Shipbuilders.
- Charles Alfred Jeffrey Hunt, Labourer, Britannia Royal Naval College, Ministry of Defence.
- Geoffrey Hunt, Gas Fitter, South Western Region, British Gas Corporation.
- Ellen Enid, Mrs Hurst, Area Welfare Coordinator, Northumbria Area, Women's Royal Voluntary Service.
- Fred Ivison, lately Postal Executive C, Carlisle, North Western Postal Board, The Post Office.
- John Jamieson, Leading Fireman, Strathclyde Fire Brigade.
- Leonard Johnson, Professional and Technology Officer Grade III, Ministry of Defence.
- Thomas Peter Johnson, Receiving Inspection Material Manager, Rolls-Royce Ltd., Leavesden.
- Robert Edward Jones, Sergeant, Metropolitan Police.
- David Clifford Ross-Jones. For services to the Disabled Drivers' Association.
- Miss Muriel Ann Keeble, Administrative Assistant, Sales Support, Appliance Marketing Branch, Commercial Department, North Western Electricity Board.
- Daniel Keenan, Youth Worker, Gibbshill, Greenock.
- Leslie Alfred Keenes, Office Keeper Grade 1, Board of Customs and Excise.
- Robert Henry Killip, Chargehand, Windscale Nuclear Power Development Laboratories, United Kingdom Atomic Energy Authority.
- George Malcolm King, Technical Officer, Southampton Telephone Area, South West Telecommunications Board, The Post Office.
- Joseph King, Foreign and Commonwealth Office.
- Miss Ruth Elizabeth Annie Kirby, lately Sub-Postmistress, Middle Barton, Oxfordshire.
- John David Knight, Foreman Grade 3 (Installation Inspection and Meter Fixing), London Electricity Board.
- Alfred William1 Lacey, Motor Mechanic, Margate Lifeboat, Royal National Lifeboat Institution.
- Douglas Large, Driver, Crewe, British Rail.
- Joseph Keith Lee, Constable, West Yorkshire Metropolitan Police.
- David Lemon, Constable, Royal Ulster Constabulary.
- Miss Sarah Lenaghan, Shepherd, New Luce, Newton Stewart, Wigtownshire.
- Alfred Aaron Levy, Registered Dock Worker, Port of London Authority.
- Sidney Leonard Lewis, Chief Officer II, Usk Borstal and Detention Centre.
- Tudor Noel Lewis, General Foreman, MetallurgicalLaboratory, Highland Fabricators Ltd.
- John Mcauley, Street Sweeper, Central District, Glasgow City Council.
- Eric Andrew McCallie, Process Worker, Chapelcross Works, British Nuclear Fuels Ltd.
- Mary Johanna, Mrs McDonald, Chargehand Waitress, Metropolitan Police.
- James McGrath, lately Coal Delivery Man, Manchester.
- Charles Henry Macgregor, Assistant Gardener, Greenwich Park, Department of the Environment.
- Patrick Joseph McGuigan, Sub-Officer, Fire Authority for Northern Ireland.
- Duncan Pollock McGuinness, Process Operator, Falkirk Works, British Steel Corporation (Chemicals) Ltd.
- Donald McLEOD, Sub-Officer, Tyne and Wear Fire Brigade.
- George Smith Macleod, Messenger, Highlands and Islands Development Board.
- David Pow Blyth McRobb, lately Rigger, Llandarcy Refinery, BP Oil Ltd.
- Robert Hugh McVeigh, Heavy Goods Vehicle Driver, Northern Ireland Carriers Ltd.
- William Bernard Maddock, Centreless Grinding Machine Operator, IMI Titanium Ltd, Swansea.
- Margaret Gwyn, Mrs Matthews, Joint County Emergency Services Organiser, East Dorset, Women's Royal Voluntary Service.
- William Hugh Maybin, Driver, Northern Ireland Carriers Ltd.
- Stanley William George Meddick, Distribution Supervisor, South Western Region, British Gas Corporation.
- Elizabeth Clark, Mrs Millar, Creel Carrying Fishwife, Edinburgh.
- William Francis Milligan, Estate Warden, Ministry of Defence.
- Andrew Milliken, Chauffeur, Belfast City Council.
- Emily, Mrs Minear, lately Canteen Worker, Mount Charles County Primary School, St Austell, Cornwall.
- Stephen James Moore, Gardener, Sussex Constabulary.
- John Morrison, Constable, Fife Constabulary.
- Dorothy Elizabeth, Mrs Morton, Office Keeper Grade III, Board of Inland Revenue.
- Peter Henry Ranee Munday, Civilian Instructional Officer Grade III (Explosives), Ministry of Defence.
- George Edward Murphy, Experimental Worker I, Daresbury Laboratory, Science Research Council.
- Robert Forrest Murphy, Civil Engineering Superintendent (Maintenance Foreman), Central Scotland Water Development Board.
- John Thomas Oliver, Senior Highway Superintendent, Staffordshire Moorlands Area, County Highways Department, Staffordshire County Council.
- Jeffrey Oxley, Knitter/Mechanic, G. H. Hurt and Son, Nottingham. For Services to Export.
- Douglas Arthur George Paine, Foreman, Marshall of Cambridge (Engineering) Ltd.
- Michael Ranleigh Parr, Sergeant, Greater Manchester Police.
- Martha Rosina, Mrs Passmore, Senior Messenger, Civil Service Department.
- John William Peffers, Metro Driver, Tyne and Wear Passenger Transport Executive.
- William Edward Phillips, Security Officer Grade III, HM Treasury.
- Edward Henry Phillpott, Second Mate, "Admiral Day", Dover Harbour Board.
- Bronislaw Wojciech Pieprzyca, Chargehand, Martin Baker Aircraft Company Ltd, Middlesex.
- Edward Herbert Pooley, Head Gardener, 1st Class, France Area, Commonwealth War Graves Commission.
- Robert Stephens Porter, Sergeant, Royal Ulster Constabulary.
- Louis Edward Priest, Spring Hammer Forger, Footprint Tools Ltd, Sheffield.
- John Leonard Quarton, Instructional Officer Grade III, Department of Employment.
- Ronald Ratcliffe, Sub-Postmaster, Milne Park East (Croydon) and Portland Road, London SE25 (SEDO), The Post Office.
- David John Rees, Master Tailor, Carmarthen, Dyfed.
- Marion, Mrs Reid, Telephone Operator, Department of Employment.
- Cecil Milton Rhodes, Foreign and Commonwealth Office.
- Keith John Robinson, Professional and Technology Officer III, Department of the Environment.
- Lilian, Mrs Robinson, Housekeeper, St John's College, University of Durham.
- Sheila Rosemary, Mrs Robinson, Canteen Supervisor, British Nuclear Fuels Ltd., Windscale and Calder Works, Cumbria.
- William Edwin Rooke, Process and General Supervisory Grade "B", Ministry of Defence.
- Richard Thomas Rose, Process and General Supervisory Grade D, Ministry of Defence.
- Iris Florence, Mrs Rushton, District Organiser, North Bedfordshire, Women's Royal Voluntary Service.
- Winnie, Mrs Russell, Cleaner, Metropolitan Police.
- Elias Scott, Foreman, Bangor Shipyard Company Ltd.
- Florence May, Mrs Sears. For services to the community in Hereford and Worcester.
- Frank Charles Mather Seville, Clerk (Cl), General Administration Section, East Midlands Electricity Board.
- Henry John Shipman, Craftsman (Painter), Department of the Environment.
- Edward John Simmonds, Sergeant, Gwent Constabulary.
- Gwendoline Alexa, Mrs Simmons. For services to the community in Horley, Surrey.
- Miss Olive Hallam-Sims, Club Manager, Navy, Army and Air Force Institutes, RAF Station, Leeming.
- Eveline, Mrs Smale. For services to the Blind in Southerndown, Mid-Glamorgan.
- Miss Agnes Margaret Smith. For services to the community in Hitchin, Hertfordshire.
- Arthur Alec Smith, lately Sergeant Major Instructor, Suffolk, Army Cadet Force.
- Thomas Stanley Smith, lately Chauffeur, Engineering Research Station, British Gas Corporation.
- Harold Spencer, County Staff Officer, St John Ambulance Brigade, Derbyshire.
- Mabel, Mrs Stagey, Member, Solihull, Women's Royal Voluntary Service.
- Edgar Peter John Stern, Farrier and Blacksmith, Council of Small Industries in Rural Areas.
- George William Stevenson, Plater, Huwood Ltd., Tyne and Wear.
- Thomas William Swires, Head Mechanic, Home Office.
- John Owen Tall, Chief Steward 1, Ministry of Defence.
- William Robert Thomas, lately Process and General Supervisory B (Catering Officer), Ministry of Defence.
- Edward James Thrower, Senior Shop Steward, Transport and General Workers Union, Felixstowe Dock and Railway Company Ltd.
- Herbert Todd, Serjeant Major Instructor, Kent, Army Cadet Force.
- James Claude Tungate, Mechanic, Norwich Branch, National Carriers Ltd.
- Margaret Kathleen Mary, Mrs Vogwell. For services to the Wirral Toy Library for the Incapacitated.
- Mary Doreen, Mrs Wade. For services to the community in Dundonald, Belfast.
- Edward Henry George Wakeford. For services to the Sussex Beekeepers Association.
- Bella Grace, Mrs Walsh, Cleaner, Devizes, Kennet District Council.
- Albert Charles Ward, Senior Site Engineer, Priest Furnaces Ltd. For services to Export.
- Florence Mary, Mrs Ward, Home Help, Northamptonshire County Council.
- Joseph Douglas Webb, Engineering Inspector, Manchester Central Telephone Area, Post Office Telecommunications.
- Frank Neville Webster, Signalman, Bishop Auckland, Eastern Region, British Rail.
- William Allan White. For services to the community in Morebattle, Kelso.
- Frank George Whitfield. For services to the community, particularly disabled people in Sale, Cheshire.
- Harold Alfred Widdows, Professional and Technology Officer Grade III, Ministry of Defence.
- Roy Widdowson, Back Ripper, North Yorkshire Area, National Coal Board.
- Edith Beatrice Mary, Mrs Williams. For services to the community, particularly the Martin's Gate Further Education Unit in Lipson, Plymouth.
- Gwynfor Williams, Association Organiser, St John Ambulance Brigade, Gwynedd.
- Elsie Louisa, Mrs Willson. For services to the community, particularly to disabled children in Colchester.
- Miss Kathleen Ada Wilson, Baths Supervisor, Greater London Council.
- Gordon Hector Winch, Professional and Technology Officer Grade III, Ministry of Defence.
- James Fred Winter, Supervising Instructional Officer Grade I, Ministry of Defence.
- Anne, Mrs Winterburn, Secretary and Founder Member, Friends of Chesterton Hospital.
- Miss Brenda Martin Woodward, Sergeant, Cheshire Constabulary.
- Hubert Charles Worledge, lately General Services Superintendent, Suffolk College of Higher Education.
- Kenneth David Worley, Senior Foreman, Warton Division, British Aerospace.
- Edward Wragg. For service to the community in Southwell, Nottinghamshire.
- Cyril William Wright, Sub-Officer, Lincolnshire Fire Brigade.
- John Shields Wylie, Joinery Supervisor, Wallsend Shipyard, Swan Hunter Shipbuilders Ltd.
- Christopher Yorston, Driver/Operator, London Country Bus Services Ltd.

Overseas Territories

- Gabriel Manso Antonio, Warrant Officer, Royal Auxiliary Air Force, Hong Kong.
- Peter Bonifacio, Airport Station Manager, Civil Airport, Gibraltar.
- Eva Rebecca, Mrs Fowler, Nursing Supervisor, Mental Hospital, St Helena.
- Samuel Augustus Hancock, Community Worker, St Kitts.
- Miss Iris Hodge. For services to the community in Anguilla.
- Lai Wing-Kay, Police Telecommunications Assistant I, Police Department, Hong Kong.
- Li But, Steward Class I, Government Service, Hong Kong.
- Yu Tso-wing, Clerical Officer I, Police Department, Hong Kong.
- Yue Tony Tung-pik, Clerical Officer II, The Red Cross, Hong Kong.

==== State of Victoria ====
- Nicholas Cole. For service to angling.
- Ester Theresa, Mrs Collins. For community service.
- Nora, Mrs Crabbe. For community service.
- Reginald Alexander Craig. For service to ex-servicemen.
- Robert William Donald. For Ambulance service.
- Bernard Cyril Drake. For service to hospital administration.
- Colin Edward Haeusler. For community service.
- Jean Hill, Mrs Handyside. For community service.
- Jean Catherine, Mrs Hindhaugh. For service to infant welfare.
- Frank Aumont Holcombe. For service to disabled children.
- Alberta Victoria, Mrs Hughes. For community service.
- Emma Elizabeth, Mrs Learmonth. For community service.
- Norman Edgar Marks. For community service.
- Mervyn Murdoch McKay. For service to young people.
- Walter Thomas Mott. For service to journalism.
- Flore Lilias Hardy, Mrs Nankervis. For community service.
- Miss Margery Cameron Nicoll. For service to the Guide Movement.
- Sister Elizabeth Ethel Sadlier. For community service.
- Mervin Robert Stevenson. For service to rural industry.
- Charles Francis Whitla. For service to firearm safety education.
- Audrey Marion Wines. For service to St John Ambulance Brigade

==== State of Queensland ====
- William John Atkinson. For services to the pineapple industry.
- Miss Kathleen Mary Barwick. For services to nursing.
- Owen Colin Campbell. For services to the T.B. Sailors, Soldiers and Airmen's Association of Queensland.
- Amy Alice, Mrs Dickinson. For community services.
- Donald Hamilton Thomson Findlay. For service to the community.
- Madge Kathleen, Mrs Hardy. For services to the community and the Guides.
- John Evan Mckenzie. For services to the community and the Returned Services League.
- Miss Mary Theresa McLaren. For services to nursing.
- Mary Paterson, Mrs McRoberts. For services to the community.
- Margaret Lennox Fitzroy, Mrs Scholefield. For services to the Little Theatre Movement.
- Donald Fitzgerald Trout. For services to the grazing industry.

==== State of South Australia ====
- Miss Barbara Allan. For public service in South Australia Police Department.
- Pansy Eveline, Mrs Brown. For services to the community.
- Robert Garfield Caldicott. For services to broadcasting.
- Colin Walter Cook. For services to radiography.
- Betty, Mrs Fletcher. For services to the community.
- Alexander Roberts. For services to cycling.

==== State of Western Australia ====
- Nan Anderson, Mrs Gawthorpe. For services to the community.
- Beatrice Margaret, Mrs Hagg. For services to the community.
- John Francis Kostera. For services to the community.
- Miss Barbara Lord. For services to the community.
- William James Reside. For services to the community.

=== Royal Red Cross ===
==== Member of the Royal Red Cross (RRC) ====
- Principal Matron Jean Robertson, A.R.R.C, Queen Alexandra's Royal Naval Nursing Service.
- Major (Acting Lieutenant Colonel) Diana Geraldine Mary Anderson A.R.R.C., Queen Alexandra's Royal Army Nursing Corps.
- Major (Acting Lieutenant Colonel). Gillian Margaret Fisher, Queen Alexandra's Royal Army Nursing Corps.
- Lieutenant Colonel Stella Margaret Houghton T.D., Queen Alexandra's Royal Army Nursing Corps, Territorial Army.

==== Associate of the Royal Red Cross (ARRC) ====
- Major Charlotte Bertha Fraser, Queen Alexandra's Royal Army Nursing Corps.
- Sergeant (Acting Staff Sergeant) Margaret Ann Harris, Queen Alexandra's Royal Army Nursing Corps.
- Captain Anthony Lyne, Royal Army Medical Corps.
- Major Olive Florence Read, Queen Alexandra's Royal Army Nursing Corps.
- Major Helena Gladys Tillson, Queen Alexandra's Royal Army Nursing Corps, Territorial Army.

=== Air Force Cross (AFC) ===
- Lieutenant Jerry Grayson, Royal Navy.
- Wing Commander Philip Frederick Jocelyn Burton, Royal Air Force (Retired).
- Wing Commander George Beaufort Robertson, Royal Air Force (Retired).
- Wing Commander Ian William Strachan, M.B.E., Royal Air Force.
- Squadron Leader Malcolm Richard Coe, Royal Air Force.
- Squadron Leader Malcolm David Pledger, Royal Air Force.
- Squadron Leader John Winston Thorpe, Royal Air Force.
- Flight Lieutenant Ian Hugh Laurie, Royal Air Force.
- Flight Lieutenant Michael Lowery Naylor, Royal Air Force.
- Flight Lieutenant David Anthony Waring, Royal Air Force.

=== Queen's Police Medal (QPM) ===
England and Wales

- Kenneth Wallace Abraham, lately Chief Superintendent, South Wales Constabulary.
- Michael Edward Bricknell, Chief Superintendent, Thames Valley Police.
- Frederick Stanley Childerstone, Commander, Metropolitan Police.
- Peter Clark Duffy, Commander, Metropolitan Police.
- Arthur Bernard Filbey, Chief Superintendent, Lancashire Constabulary.
- Harry Hull, Assistant Chief Constable, Wiltshire Constabulary.
- Daniel Peter Hunt, Commander, Metropolitan Police.
- Eric Raymond James, Deputy Chief Constable, North Yorkshire Police.
- Samuel Leckey, lately Deputy Assistant Commissioner, Metropolitan Police.
- Basil Nichols, Assistant Chief Constable, British Transport Police.
- Barry David Keith Price, Chief Constable, Cumbria Constabulary.
- William George McKenzie Sutherland, Chief Constable, Bedfordshire Police.
- Keith Taylor, Chief Superintendent, City of London Police.
- Frank Edward Whalley, Commandant, Police Training Centre, Eynsham Hall.
- Robert Aylmer Wildblood, Assistant Chief Constable, Dyfed-Powys Police.

Northern Ireland

- George Henry Irvine, Inspector, Royal Ulster Constabulary.

Overseas Territories

- John Ronaldson Johnston, C.P.M., Assistant Commissioner of Police, Royal Hong Kong Police Force.
- John Joseph Sheehy, C.P.M., Superintendent of Police, Bermuda Police Force.
- Nylon Leonard Tso, C.P.M., Chief Superintendent of Police, Royal Hong Kong Auxiliary Police Force.

State of Victoria

- John Roderick Hall, Assistant Commissioner, Victoria Police Service.
- Alan Coysh, Chief Superintendent, Victoria Police Service.
- Harold Vernon Norton, Superintendent, Victoria Police Service.

State of Queensland

- Charles Desmond Dwyer, Superintendent, Queensland Police Force.
- George Henry Fursman, Superintendent, Queensland Police Force.
- Joseph William Keen, Superintendent, Queensland Police Force.

State of South Australia

- David Alexander Hunt, Chief Superintendent, South Australia Police Force.
- William John Low, Superintendent, South Australia Police Force.

Scotland

- William Cameron Melville, Deputy Chief Constable, Tayside Police.
- Alistair Douglas Petrie, Assistant Chief Constable, Strathclyde Police.

=== Queen's Fire Service Medal ===
England and Wales

- Ralph Terence Ford, Chief Fire Officer, North Yorkshire Fire Brigade.
- Brian Leslie Fuller, Chief Fire Officer, Nottinghamshire Fire Brigade.
- Martin Killoran, Deputy Chief Officer, Greater Manchester Fire Brigade.
- Frederick Charles Ponsford, M.B.E., Chief Fire Officer, Avon Fire Brigade.
- Dennis James Willmott, Chief Staff Officer, London Fire Brigade.

State of Victoria

- Donald Eric Fleming, Captain, Monbulk Rural Fire Brigade.
- Ian Keith Johnson, Regional Officer, Victoria Country Fire Authority.
- Graham John Stork, Assistant Chief Officer, Victoria Country Fire Authority.
- Norman Noel Webster, Captain, Pakenham Urban Fire Brigade.

=== Colonial Police Medal ===
- Kwong Chan, Station Sergeant of Police, Royal Hong Kong Police Force.
- Ping-ki Chan, Station Sergeant of Police, Royal Hong Kong Police Force.
- Kam-keung Chung, Station Sergeant of Police, Royal Hong Kong Police Force.
- John Malcolm Crosby, Chief Inspector of Police, Royal Hong Kong Police Force.
- Cyril Fretwell, Senior Divisional Officer, Hong Kong Fire Services.
- Peter Lloyd George, Divisional Officer, Hong Kong Fire Services.
- Frederick Cecil Isaac, M.M., Sergeant of Police, St Helena Police Force.
- Francis Stewart Kavanagh, Senior Superintendent of Police, Royal Hong Kong Police Force.
- Mau-chuen Kung, Station Sergeant of Police, Royal Hong Kong Police Force.
- Chek-yuen Lam, Senior Divisional Officer, Hong Kong Fire Services.
- Mun-cheong Lam, Chief Inspector of Police, Royal Hong Kong Police Force.
- Ping-man Lam, Sergeant of Police, Royal Hong Kong Police Force.
- Kwan-cheung Lee, Sergeant of Police, Royal Hong Kong Police Force.
- Chung-keung Li, Station Sergeant of Police, Royal Hong Kong Police Force.
- Wai Li, Principal Fireman, Hong Kong Fire Services.
- Gwyn Rees Lloyd, Senior Superintendent of Police, Royal Hong Kong Police Force.
- Donald Rudolph Marshall, Senior Superintendent of Police, Belize Police Force.
- Andrew McKerracher Quinn, Chief Inspector of Police, Royal Hong Kong Police Force.
- Jocelyn Benta, Mrs Richards, Inspector of Police, Royal Antigua Police Force.
- Alfred McGirold Burgess Simmons, M.B.E. Deputy Commandant, Bermuda Police Reserve.
- Richard Courtney Smallshaw, Chief Superintendent of Police, Royal Hong Kong Police Force.
- Kwong-yee Tang, Police Constable, Royal Hong Kong Police Force.
- Michael John Watson, Superintendent of Police, Royal Hong Kong Police Force.
- Shu-hsin Wong, Chief Inspector of Police, Royal Hong Kong Police Force.
- Hung Yau, Sergeant of Police, Royal Hong Kong Police Force.

=== Queen's Commendation for Valuable Service in the Air ===
- Lieutenant Commander Peter James Greer Harper, Royal Navy.
- Lieutenant Jeremy Phillip English, Royal Navy.
- Squadron Leader Jannes McIlveen Boyd, Royal Air Force.
- Squadron Leader William Michael Nigel Cross, Royal Air Force.
- Squadron Leader Stephen Geoffrey Jennings, Royal Air Force.
- Squadron Leader Alan James Kearney, Royal Air Force.
- Squadron Leader Douglas George Lee, M.B.E., Royal Air Force.
- Squadron Leader Henry Victor Lether, Royal Air Force.
- Squadron Leader Guy Phillip Woods, Royal Air Force.
- Acting Squadron Leader Mark Stephen Hopgood, Royal Air Force (Retired).
- Flight Lieutenant David Alexander Angus, Royal Air Force.
- Flight Lieutenant Leslie Herbert Aylott, Royal Air Force.
- Flight Lieutenant John Alfred Cliffe, Royal Air Force.
- Flight Lieutenant Stephen John Cotton, Royal Air Force (Retired).
- Flight Lieutenant Peter Allan Crawford, Royal Air Force.
- Flight Lieutenant Peter Dunlop, Royal Air Force.
- Flight Lieutenant John Lloyd, Royal Air Force.
- Flight Lieutenant Michael Brian Roy Marriott, Royal Air Force.
- Flight Lieutenant Derek Whatling, Royal Air Force.
- Alan Castle, Chief Training Captain BAE 1-11 Fleet, British Caledonian.
- John Allan Chalmers, Training Captain, Britannia Airways Ltd.
- Michael Henry Bruce Snelling, Sea Harrier Lead Project Pilot, Kingston-Brough Division, British Aerospace.
- Raymond Woollett, Chief Navigator, Warton Division Aircraft Group, British Aerospace.

== Australia ==
=== Knight Bachelor ===
- Professor Frank Adams Callaway, C.M.G., O.B.E. For service to music education.
- Robert William Cole. For public service.
- Ronald Stuart Elliott. For service to banking.
- Eric Paul McClintock. For service to export and industry.
- Russel Tullie Madigan, O.B.E. For service to commerce and industry.
- Reverend Dr. Alan Edgar Walker, O.B.E. For service to religion.

=== Order of the Bath ===
==== Companion of the Order of the Bath (CB) ====
- John Henry Curtis. For public service.
- William John O'Reilly, O.B.E. For public service.

=== Order of Saint Michael and Saint George ===
==== Knight Commander of the Order of St Michael and St George (KCMG) ====
- The Right Honourable Phillip Reginald Lynch, M.P. For parliamentary service.

==== Companion of the Order of St Michael and St George (CMG) ====
- The Honourable Peter Howson. For Parliamentary and community service.
- Robert James Parish, O.B.E. For service to the sport of cricket.
- Most Reverend Dr. Geoffrey Tremayne Sambell. For service to religion and the community.

=== Order of the British Empire ===
==== Knight Commander of the Order of the British Empire (KBE) ====
Military Division

Air Marshal Neville Patrick McNamara, A.O., C.B.E., D.F.C. 011353, Royal Australian Air Force.

Civil Division

- The Honourable Mr. Justice Edward Stratten Williams. For service to law and the community.

==== Dame Commander of the Order of the British Empire (DBE) ====
Civil Division

- Beryl Edith, Mrs. Beaurepaire, service to women's affairs.

==== Commander of the Order of the British Empire (CBE) ====
Military Division

- Commodore Lawrence John McInerny 0816, Royal Australian Navy.
- Brigadier Maurice Joseph Ewing 17564, Australian Army Legal Corps.
- Brigadier James Osmond Furner, M.B.E. 33809, Australian Staff Corps.

Civil Division

- James Gollan Cooper. For service to the media and the community.
- Senator Gordon Sinclair Davidson. For parliamentary service.
- Barrie Graham Dexter. For public service.
- William Donald Heffron. For service to dentistry.
- Professor Albert Russell Main. For service to education and science.
- William Abernethy Park. For service to commerce.
- John Athol Pettifer. For public service.
- Harry McEwin Scambler. For service to commerce.
- Hamilton d'Arcy Sutherland. For service to medicine.

==== Officer of the Order of the British Empire (OBE) ====
Civil Division

- Dr. Colin Warden Anderson. For service to medicine.
- David Frederick Saville Barnett. For public service.
- Robert Douglas Botterill. For public service.
- Patricia Marie, Mrs. Bridges. For service to the sport of golf and the community.
- Ellis Howard (Dick) Burgess. For service to commerce and the community.
- Stephen Edward (Sam) Calder, D.F.C. For parliamentary service.
- Professor Arthur Frederick Cobbold. For service to medical education.
- Thomas James Bailey Connor. For service to primary industry and engineering.
- David Joseph Crossin. For service to the community.
- Francis Michael Davidson. For service to primary industry.
- Daniel Randal Dossetor, D.F.C. For service to the building industry.
- Ronald Warr Eaton, M.B.E. For service to the shipping industry.
- Alan Newbury Edwards. For service to the community.
- Bruce William Graham. For parliamentary service.
- Edward Charles Hauser. For service to the textile industry.
- Colin Sidney Hayes. For service to horse racing.
- Charles Maxwell Hazelton. For service to aviation.
- Thomas Gordon Hungerford. For service to veterinary science.
- Miss Miriam Beatrice Hyde (Mrs. Edwards). For service to music.
- Deputy Commissioner Reginald Ernest Kennedy, Q.P.M. For public service.
- Dr. Eric William Kings. For service to dentistry.
- Henry Richard Krygier. For service to publishing and the community.
- Henry Souttar Lodge. For service to the community.
- Andrew Charles Collin Menzies. For public service.
- Emil Edmund Nuske. For service to the wheat industry.
- Ronald John Page. For public service.
- Edwin William Wallace Peatt. For service to the wine industry.
- Graham Ernest Pryke. For service to disabled people and the community.
- Patrick George Ryan. For service to hockey
- Julius Albert Francis Shipton. For public service and service to commerce.
- Right Reverend Monsignor Owen Beevor Steele, M.B.E., M.C. For service to the community and to religion.
- Barrie Sharpe Virtue. For public service.
- Jack Walsh. For service to sport.

==== Member of the Order of the British Empire (MBE) ====
Military Division

Royal Australian Navy

- Lieutenant Commander Kenneth Vincent Clements 01930, Royal Australian Navy.
- Lieutenant Commander Richard Llewelyn Philipps Jones 01972, Royal Australian Navy.
- Lieutenant Commander Leslie William Thomas Somerville 01935, Royal Australian Navy.

Australian Army

- Major Maurice William Galt 215342, Royal Australian Army Ordnance Corps.
- Major Arthur Robert Hicks 1410395, Royal Australian Corps of Signals.
- Major Garry Herbert Hugo 55216, Royal Australian Army Ordnance Corps.
- Major Darryl Charles Low Choy 15705, Royal Australian Engineers.
- Major Malcolm Thomas Rawcliffe Wilkinson 37497, Royal Regiment of Australian Artillery.

Royal Australian Air Force

- Squadron Leader Philip Leonard Gorringe-Smith 0223530, Royal Australian Air Force.
- Squadron Leader Ernest Sydney Hulbert 0217708, Royal Australian Air Force.
- Squadron Leader Jack Lynch 045551, Royal Australian Air Force.
- Squadron Leader Stephen John Papas 0112994, Royal Australian Air Force.

Civil Division

- Henry Edward York Bell, M.C. For service to disabled veterans.
- Reverend Victor George Boettcher. For service to religion.
- Peter Gordon Brown. For service to aviation.
- Maxwell Keith Carpenter. For public service.
- Maxwell Foster Chesterman. For service to the community.
- Gwendoline May, Mrs. Cooper. For service to the community.
- Councillor Albert William Cox. For service to local government.
- Miss Esther May Deason. For service to softball.
- Alojzy Dziendziel. For service to migrants and the community.
- Irene Estelle, Mrs. Ellis. For service to the community and the aged.
- Geoffrey William Finney, J.P. For service to the community and tourism.
- Dr. David Charles Fison. For service to medicine.
- Sister (Mrs.) Noreen Mary Elizabeth Francis. For service to health and the community.
- Edward Cyril Gare. For service to Aboriginal welfare.
- James Morris Gibb. For service to commerce and the community.
- Robert James Gilchrist. For service to education.
- John Gleeson. For service to primary industry.
- Nerida Josephine, Mrs. Goodman. For service to women's affairs and the Jewish community.
- Monica Augustine, Mrs. Haenes. For service to sport and the community.
- Ernst Bernhard Heyne, J.P. For service to the community.
- Dr. John Llewellyn Hickman. For service to disabled people.
- David Hogan. For public service.
- Keith Staniforth Hopkins. For service to journalism and the community.
- Alderman Harold Clifton Howard, J.P. For service to local government and the community.
- Stuart Gerald Inder. For service to journalism.
- Malcolm Gilmour Jamieson. For public service.
- Milton Lewis. For service to journalism and the community.
- Keith Gordon Lober. For service to primary industry and the community.
- Howard Spencer McComb. For service to the community.
- Sister Mary Gemma (Miss McCullagh). For service to education.
- Thomas Babington Macaulay, M.C. For service to the community.
- Milton Edgar March. For service to education.
- James Edward (Joe) Marston. For service to soccer.
- Reverend Father Francis Michael Martin. For service to education.
- Sydney William O'Reilly. For service to veterans.
- Sister Mary Julien (Miss Pearson). For service to welfare.
- Arthur Charles Penwarn. For service to rifle shooting.
- The Very Reverend Kyriacos Constantinou Psalios. For service to the community.
- Marjorie Eileen, Mrs. Quinn. For service to ex-servicewomen.
- Alistair McDonald Ramsay. For service to basketball.
- Kenneth Rupert Riley. For service to the community.
- Dr. Henry Collin Robjohns. For service to the community..
- Dr. Una Shergold, (Mrs. O'Day). For service to medicine.
- Ronald Desmond David Siddons. For service to lifesaving and disabled people.
- Margaret, Mrs. Slattery. For service to the community.
- Lloyd Neville Smith. For service to local government and the community.
- Stanley Stafford. For service to the community.
- Thomas Ian Stewart. For service to the blind.
- Alan Gordon Strode, J.P. For service to the community, youth and Aboriginal welfare.
- Colin Irving Sullivan. For service to local government and the community.
- Miss Betty Winifred Thorpe. For service to housing.
- Harry Norton Trowbridge. For public service.
- Leonard James Turner. For service to veterans and the community.
- Reverend Dr. Gloster Stuart Udy. For service to the community.
- Councillor George Ambrose Walter. For service to local government and the community.
- Bruce Whatman. For public service.
- Thomas Lloyd George Williams. For public service.

=== Companion of the Imperial Service Order (ISO) ===
- Raymond Maurice Brown. For public service.
- James Herbert Harper, A.F.C. For public service.
- Thomas Richmond Rees. For public service.
- Desmond Percival Smith. For public service to engineering.
- John Graham Wickens. For public service.

=== British Empire Medal (BEM) ===
Military Division

Royal Australian Navy

- Chief Petty Officer Warren Edward Maisey R58677, Royal Australian Navy.
- Chief Petty Officer Graham Herbert Miller R48448, Royal Australian Navy.
- Chief Petty Officer Barrie Trevor Quigley R93912, Royal Australian Navy.

Australian Army

- Staff Sergeant Keith Roy Ayliffe 217354, Royal Regiment of Australian Artillery.
- Staff Sergeant Thomas Michael Barry 3174002, Royal Australian Army Medical Corps.
- Staff Sergeant Edward Thomas Bevans 55289, Royal Corp of Australian Electrical and Mechanical Engineers.
- Sergeant Ronald Alwyn Brian Freeman 2237712, Royal Australian Infantry Corps.
- Staff Sergeant William Frederick Honter 55130, Australian Army Band Corps.
- Sergeant John Raymond Lucy 218416, Royal Australian Corps of Signals.

Royal Australian Air Force

- Flighl Sergeant Harold James Allie All3088, Royal Australian Air Force.
- Flight Sergeant Donald William Byrnes A217539, Royal Australian Ak Force.
- Sergeant Edward William Sanim All3140, Royal Australian Air Force.

Civil Division

- Ailsa Barbara, Mrs. Aldous. For service to the community.
- Leslie Thomas Atkins. For service to the Boy Scouts' Association.
- Daisie Eileen, Mrs. Beattie. For service to the community.
- Ronald McKenzie Beesley, J.P. For service to the community.
- Lieutenant Commander (Cadet) Bruce Boneham. For service to youth and the community.
- Jean MacGregor, Mrs. Bournon. For service to the community.
- Phyliss, Mrs. Bower. For service to the Girl Guides' Association.
- Dorothy Nell, Mrs. Brain. For service to the community.
- Jessie Helen Rutherford, Mrs. Brazel. For service to the community.
- Miss Helena Grace Bromley. For service to the community.
- John Patrick Buckley. For community and public service.
- William Campbell. For service to youth.
- James William Coetzee, J.P. For service to the' community.
- Joseph Aloysius Courtney. For service to veterans.
- Bertha Mabel, Mrs. Dennis. For service to the community.
- Murray Richard Dimble. For service to disabled people.
- Gloria Gwendoline, Mrs. Fergusson. For service to the community.
- Francis James Fletcher. For public service.
- Donald Horsley Fowler. For service to veterans and the community.
- Charles James Galloway. For service to the community.
- Elsie Maude, Mrs. Gare. For service to Aboriginal welfare.
- Thomas William Gillow. For service to primary industry and local government
- Ella Mavis, Mrs. Gordon. For service to the community.
- Ernest Norman Graham. For service to veterans and the community.
- Evelyn, Mrs. Koshnitsky. For services to chess.
- Margaret Rose, Mrs. Loon. For service to the community.
- Thelma Eunice, Mrs. Mawson. For service to the community.
- Hazel Joy, Mrs. May. For service to the community.
- Peter Heinrich Mohr. For public service.
- Beatrix Blythewood Evie, Mrs. Mooney. For service to the community.
- Edward James Morgan. For service to the community and veterans.
- Miss Alison MacKenzie Morse. For public service.
- Charles Stephendon (Don) Morton. For service to veterans.
- Marjorie Mary, Mrs. Pritchard, For service to the community.
- Quintin Andrew Richardson, D.F.M. For service to the community.
- Richard Ernest Richmond. For public service.
- Elizabeth Alice Susan, Mrs. Sandiford. For service to the community.
- Jack Alfred Sherry. For service to the community.
- Helen (Shirley), Mrs. Stewart. For public service.
- William Eric Trask. For service to the community.
- Elizabeth Anne (Beth), Mrs. Trevan. For service to the community.
- Harry Vairy, J.P. For service to the community.
- Sylvia Ursula, Mrs. Waugh. For service to Aboriginal welfare.
- Miss Winifred Mary Wearne. For service to children.
- David Augustine West. For service to ihe com- munity.
- Barry Colin Williams. For service to the com- munity.
- Alice Frances, Mrs. Wilson. For service to veterans.
- Miss Myra Winzor. For service to religion.
- Edward Charles Woodwell. For service to disabled people.
- James Metches Harold Wright. For service to the community.

=== Queen's Police Medal ===
- Ronald Joseph Dillon, Detective Superintendent, Australian Federal Police.

=== Royal Red Cross ===
==== Associate of the Royal Red Cross (ARRC) ====
Royal Australian Navy

- Commander Patricia Catherine Vines, A.R.R.C. N2385, Royal Australian Navy Nursing Service.

Australian Army

- Major Leslie Margaret McGurgan F22980, Royal Australian Army Nursing Corps.
- Major Yvonne Dawn Peacock F15167, Royal Australian Army Nursing Corps.
- Major Rosaline Winnifred Smith F25555, Royal Australian Army Nursing Corps.

=== Air Force Cross ===
Royal Australian Air Force

- Wing Commander Robert Victor Richardson 0315477, Royal Australian Air Force.
- Flight Lieutenant Robert John Rider 0113157, Royal Australian Air Force.

=== Queen's Commendation for Valuable Service in the Air ===
Royal Australian Air Force

- Flight Lieutenant John Robert Bacchiella 0111497, Royal Australian Air Force.
- Warrant Officer Gordon Roy Glover A221447, Royal Australian Air Force.
- Squadron Leader Peter Hales 0223269, Royal Australian Air Force.
- Squadron Leader Neville Anthony Peterkin 0223695, Royal Australian Air Force.

== Mauritius ==
=== Knights Bachelor ===
- Charles Gaetan Duval. For political and public services.
- Rabindrah Ghurburrun. For political and public services.
- Keharsingh Jagatsingh. For political and public services.

=== Order of Saint Michael and Saint George ===
==== Companion, of the Order of St Michael and St George (CMG) ====
- Joseph Lewis Michael Leal. For services to industrial and social development.

=== Order of the British Empire ===
==== Commander of the Order of the British Empire (CBE) ====
- Baboo Jyodrazesing Ramdour. For services in the field of agricultural and industrial development.
- Pierre Wong Sen Leung Shing. For services to commerce and industry.

==== Officer of the Order of the British Empire (OBE) ====
- Rooplall Boodhram. For voluntary social work.
- Issop Ismael Fatehmamode. For services to commerce and industry.
- Frantz Max Lassemillante. For public service.
- Vincent Cyrille Nicolin. For marine service.
- Hookoomsing Prayag, For voluntary social work.
- Twayab Ibney Rostom. For voluntary social work.
- Narainsamy Thungapen. For community service.

==== Member of the Order of the British Empire (MBE) ====
- Krithvarma Aubeeluck. For services to primary education.
- Marie Lise Jeanne, Mrs. Bedsy. For voluntary social work.
- Marie Auguste Edouard Gabon, lately Chief Fisheries Protection Officer, Ministry of Fisheries.
- Amika Dwarka, lately Senior Inspector of Schools, Ministry of Education and Cultural Affairs.
- Rampersad Ganawry Jeewooth. For voluntary social work.
- Beewa Ladkqo. For voluntary social work.
- Aurelly Perrine. For services in the field of port activities.
- Marie Therese Yolande, Mrs. TURSAN d'Espaignet, recently Senior Reporter and Editor, Legislative Assembly.

=== British Empire Medal (BEM) ===
- Chuttergoon Aukle, lately Superintendent, Industrial School.

=== Queen's Police Medal (QPM) ===
- Ahmadkhan Hyderkhan, M.B.E., M.P.M., Deputy Commissioner, Mauritius Police Force.

=== Mauritius Police Medal ===
- Parmeswardeeal Bhoyrul, Superintendent, Mauritius Police Force.
- Louis de Gonzaque Henri Legeant, Chief Inspector, Mauritius Police Force.
- Chandraduth Seetaram, Inspector, Mauritius Police Force.

== Fiji ==
=== Order of the British Empire ===
==== Knight Commander of the Order of the British Empire (KBE) ====
- Charles Croft Marsack, C.B.E., Resident Judge of the Fiji Court of Appeal

==== Commander of the Order of the British Empire (CBE) ====
- Leslie John Gardiner, Comptroller of Customs and Excise.

==== Officer of the Order of the British Empire (CBE) ====
- Tudrau Mesake Biumaiwai. For services to health and to sport.
- Robert Denis Dods, Permanent Secretary for Tourism, Transport and Civil Aviation.
- Kamta Prasad Sharma, Deputy Registrar of the Supreme Court of Fiji.

==== Member of the Order of the British Empire (MBE) ====
Military Division

- Warrant Officer Class 1 Inoke Buadromo, Royal Fiji Military Forces

Civil Division

- James Edward Beddoes. For service to the community.
- Mohammed Takki Khan. For service to the community.
- Samuela Nayate. For service to the community.
- aisea Rawaqa Suliwaliwa. For service to the community.

=== Imperial Service Order (ISO) ===
- Suliasi Sivo Vadiga, Principal Collector, Customs, and Excise Department.

=== British Empire Medal (BEM) ===
Military Division

- Watisoni Rakaka Nakabea, Chief Petty Officer Writer, Royal Fiji Military Forces Naval Component.

Civil Division

- Isikeli Nadudukilagi Daveta. For public service.
- Harold John Henderson, Chief Fire Officer, Suva Fire Brigade.
- Ramendra Datt Mishra. For public service.
- Raghubar Prasad. For service to the community.

=== Queen's Police Medal (QPM) ===
- Malcolm Horace Moore, Superintendent, Communications Adviser to the Royal Fiji Police Force.
- Narayan Nair Panikar, F.P.M., Senior Superintendent, Royal Fiji Police Force.

== Bahamas ==
=== Order of the British Empire ===
==== Member of the Order of the British Empire (MBE) ====
Military Division

- Lieutenant Commander Amos Rolle, Royal Bahamas Defence Force.

Civil Division

- Henry Burrows. For civic service.
- Maxwell Nathaniel Taylor. For service to the Trade Union Movement.
- Neville Emmanuel Taylor, Acting Superintendent of Prisons.

=== British Empire Medal (BEM) ===
- Octavius Bastian, Leading Fireman, Nassau International Airport.
- Archibald Carroll, Environmental Health Officer.
- David Cleare. For services to the community.
- Philip Davis, Sergeant Fireman, Nassau International Airport.
- Rudolph Earthlyn Gray, Chief Building Superintendent, Ministry of Works & Utilities.
- Bernard Rosco Weech, Sergeant Fireman, Nassau International Airport.

== Papua New Guinea ==
=== Knight Bachelor ===
- The Right Reverend Zurewe Kamong Zurenuo, O.B.E. For services to religion.

=== Order of Saint Michael and Saint George ===
==== Companion of the Order of St Michael and St George (CMG) ====
- The Honourable Sevese Oipi Morea, M.P., Speaker of the National Parliament.

=== Order of the British Empire ===
==== Commander of the Order of the British Empire (CBE) ====
Civil Division

- Dr. Gabriel Bernard Gris. For public service.
- The Honourable Iambakey Okuk, M.P., Deputy Prime Minister and Minister for Transport and Civil Aviation.

==== Officer of the Order of the British Empire (OBE) ====
Civil Division

- William Henry Clark. For services to banking.
- Israel Edoni. For public service.
- Andrew Opu Maino. For public service, as a magistrate and as Ombudsman.
- Robert Robertson, M.V.O., Q.P.M. For public service.
- Mali Voi. For services to culture, in particular to Third South Pacific Festival of Arts.
- Matiabe Yuwi, M.B.E., M.P. For political and community services.

==== Member of the Order of the British Empire (MBE) ====
Civil Division

- Joseph Kavo Apau, Acting Assistant Commissioner, Corrective Institutions Service.
- Hugo Erich Berghuser. For services to youth and to rural development.
- Anton Gawi, Chief Superintendent Royal Papua New Guinea Constabulary.
- Sebea, Mrs. Geita. For services to women.
- Maiau Kalup. For services to the community.
- Betty, Mrs. Ketauwo. For services to women and to business.
- Miss Nancy Florence Lutton. For services to librarianship.
- James.Connell Mackinnon. For services to the community.
- Galopo Masa, M.P. For political and community services.
- Erna, Mrs. Pita. For services to women and the community.
- Francis Nigel Warner Shand. For services to the law.
- Apelis Turmurang. For services to local government and to the community.

Military Division

- Chief Warrant Officer Kome Peni Peni (8788), Papua New Guinea Defence Force.

=== Imperial Service Order ===
- Nasson Waninara Paulias, Administrative Secretary, East New Britain Province.

=== British Empire Medal ===
Military Division

- Corporal Gairem Pilol (81436), Papua New Guinea Defence Force.
- Corporal Ruas Toge (81551), Papua New Guinea Defence Force.
- Lance-Corporal Waram Yasi (8963), Papua New Guinea Defence Force.

Civil. Division

- John Bari, Senior Assistant Correctional Officer, Correctional Institutions Service.
- Anton Base, For public service as a driver.
- Keni Heni. For public service.
- Henry Wapi Naiawi, Sergeant Major, Royal Papua New Guinea Constabulary.
- Paulus Namba. For public service as an aid post orderly.
- Hubert Murray Omat Omat. For public service as a medical orderly.

== Solomon Islands ==
=== Order of Saint Michael and Saint George ===
==== Companion of the Order of St Michael and St George (CMG) ====
- The Right Reverend Norman Kitchiner Palmer, M.B.E., Archbishop, Church of Melanesia (Solomon Islands and New Hebrides).

=== Order of the British Empire ===
==== Member of the Order of the British Empire (MBE) ====
- Emilio Bulu. For service as Secretary to the Electoral Commission.
- George Geria Dennis Lepping. For public service and sport.
- Lily Ogatina, Mrs. Poznanski. For her contribution to public service, politics and the Church.

=== British Empire Medal (BEM) ===
- Mary, Mrs. Makini. For community services.
- John Baptist Tura. For community services.

== Tuvalu ==
=== Order of the British Empire ===
==== Officer of the Order of the British Empire (OBE) ====
- Angus McDonald. For service to the Administration.

==== Officer of the Order of the British Empire (OBE) ====
- Tulaga Manuella. For public service.

=== British Empire Medal (BEM) ===
- Katalaina, Mrs. Malua. For services to the Women's Interest Section of the Ministry for Social Services.
- Teoti Teuka. For services as a magistrate.

== St Lucia ==
=== Order of the British Empire ===
==== Officer of the Order of the British Empire (OBE) ====
- Vernon Alexander Cooper. For services to the law and for public service.

==== Member of the Order of the British Empire (MBE) ====
- Louis Boriel. For services to business and agriculture.
- Cyril Matthews, Permanent Secretary, Ministry of Agriculture, Lands, Fisheries, Cooperatives and Labour.

=== British Empire Medal (BEM) ===
- Martin Denis King, Senior Messenger in Prime Minister's Office.
- Miss Eva Mongroo. For services to education.
- Hamilton Samuel Vitalis. For services to the fishing industry.
- Willie Eulogius Volney. For services to the community.

== St Vincent and the Grenadines ==
=== Order of the British Empire ===
==== Commander of the Order of the British Empire (CBE) ====
- Hugh Haynes Hamlett, M.B.E. For public and community service.

==== Officer of the Order of the British Empire (OBE) ====
- Samuel Nathaniel Ballantyne. For services to commerce and the community.
- Gerald Baden Palmer. For service to the State, to commerce and the community.

==== Member of the Order of the British Empire (MBE) ====
- Charles Walford Alexander, Dispenser, General Hospital.
- Samuel Augustine Browne, Engineering Assistant (Buildings).
- St Aurain de Haro Seymour. For services to cricket.
