= 2026 in Tuvalu =

- Decades: 2000s; 2010s; 2020s
- See also: Other events of 2026; Timeline of Tuvaluan history

Events from 2026 in Tuvalu.

== Incumbents ==
- Monarch: Charles III
- Governor-General: Sir Tofiga Vaevalu Falani
- Prime Minister: Feleti Teo

== Events ==
- 14 April - The Tuvaluan government announces a two-week state of emergency on Funafuti island in response to growing fuel and electricity shortages.

=== Upcoming ===
- Tuvalu is expected to host a special meeting of world leaders prior to the main 2026 United Nations Climate Change Conference scheduled to be held in Turkey in November 2026.

== Holidays ==
- 1 January - New Year's Day
- 9 March - Commonwealth Day
- 3 April - Good Friday
- 4 April - Easter Saturday
- 5 April – Easter Sunday
- 6 April - Easter Monday
- 11 May - Gospel Day
- 13 June – King's Birthday
- 3 August – National Children's Day
- 1–2 October – Tuvalu Day Holiday
- 25 December - Christmas Day
- 26 December – Boxing Day
