= 2021 in Tuvalu =

- Decades: 2000s; 2010s; 2020s
- See also: Other events of 2021; Timeline of Tuvaluan history

Events from 2021 in Tuvalu.

== Incumbents ==
- Monarch: Elizabeth II
- Governor-General: Samuelu Teo (until 28 September 2021) Tofiga Vaevalu Falani onwards
- Prime Minister: Kausea Natano

== Events ==
Ongoing – COVID-19 pandemic in Oceania; COVID-19 pandemic in Tuvalu

- 28 September – Tofiga Vaevalu Falani is appointed Governor-General of Tuvalu.
- 2 November – A traveller from Tuvalu tests positive for COVID-19 upon arrival in Auckland, New Zealand. Tuvalu had not previously reported any COVID-19 cases in the country.
- 3 November – A lawyer representing the governments of Antigua and Barbuda and Tuvalu says that a new commission is being formed to sue big polluters and claim damage reparations for climate change effects on those nations before the International Tribunal for the Law of the Sea.
- 11 November – Tuvaluan Justice, Communication and Foreign Affairs Minister Simon Kofe announces that the island nation will push to retain international recognition of its statehood and maritime borders in the event that rising sea levels completely submerge the country.
