= 2022 in Tuvalu =

- Decades: 2000s; 2010s; 2020s
- See also: Other events of 2022; Timeline of Tuvaluan history

Events from 2022 in Tuvalu.

== Incumbents ==
- Monarch: Elizabeth II (until 8 September); then Charles III
- Governor-General: Sir Tofiga Vaevalu Falani
- Prime Minister: Kausea Natano

== Events ==
Ongoing – COVID-19 pandemic in Oceania; COVID-19 pandemic in Tuvalu

- 24 August – A drought and a shortage of drinking water on the islands of Nanumea, Nui, and Niutao.
- 8 September – Accession of Charles III as King of Tuvalu following the death of Queen Elizabeth II.
- 18 September – A State Memorial Service takes place in Funafuti for Elizabeth II, Queen of Tuvalu.
- 19 September – Tuvaluan representatives attend the funeral of Queen Elizabeth II in London.

== Deaths ==
- 22 May – Minute Alapati Taupo, politician, deputy prime minister (since 2019), ambassador to Taiwan (2013–2017) (born 1962)
- 8 September – Elizabeth II, Queen of Tuvalu since 1978 (born 1926)
