= List of governors-general of Charles III =

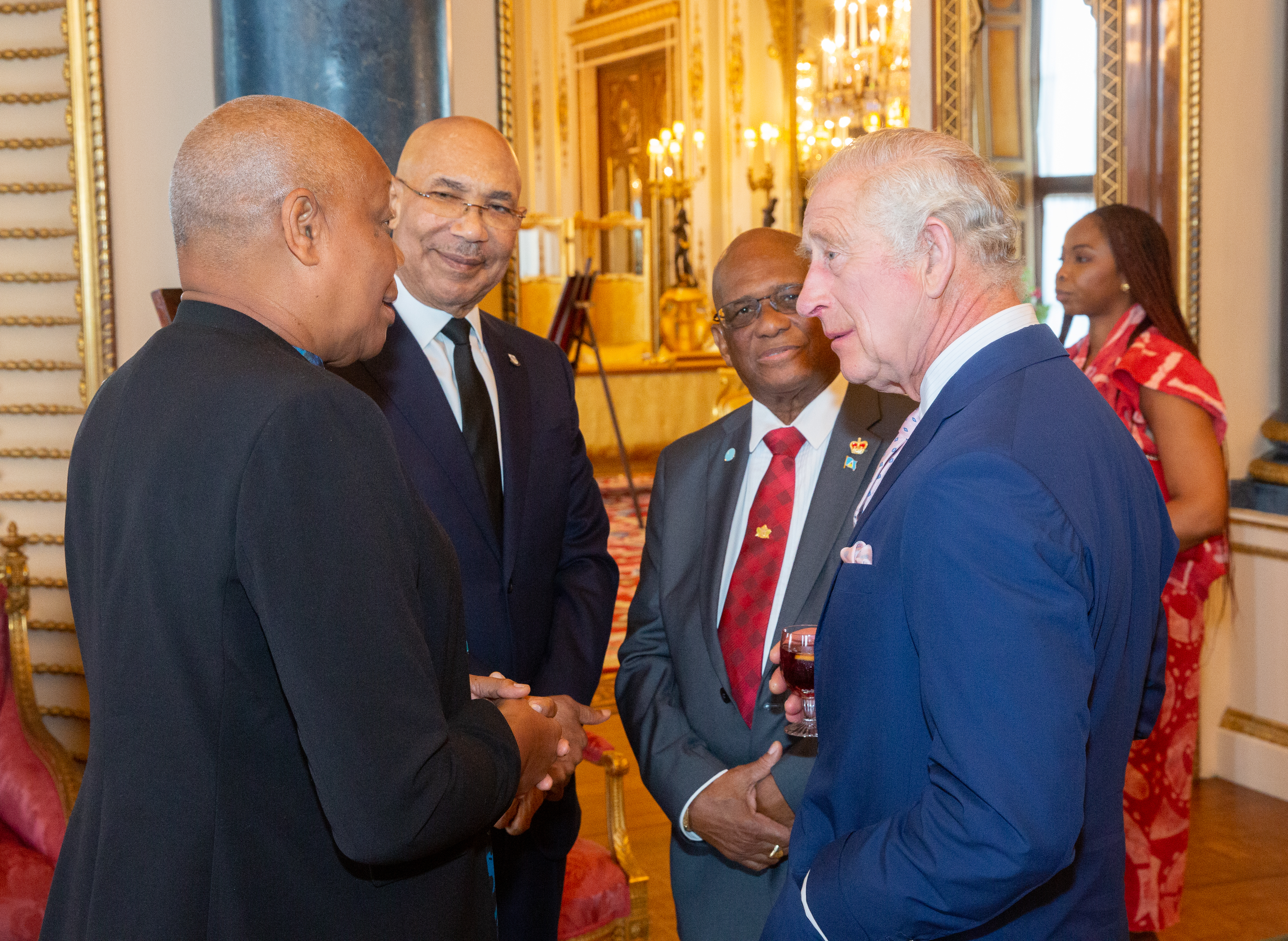
The King speaking with the governors-general of Saint Kitts and Nevis, Jamaica, and Saint Lucia, 2023

Charles III is head of state of 15 Commonwealth realms. Governors-general are appointed by the monarch in realms outside the United Kingdom to exercise many of his functions such as appointing prime ministers, dissolving Parliament, giving royal assent to legislation, and exercising other reserve powers.

Charles III has had 19 governors-general representing him during his reign and has appointed five new governors-general since his accession on 8 September 2022.

Within the United Kingdom, counsellors of state exercise some royal functions when the King is unavailable.

== List of governors-general ==
=== Antigua and Barbuda ===
No.	Portrait	Name (Birth)	Tenure	
No.	Portrait	Name (Birth)	Took office	Left office
1		Sir Rodney Williams (b. 1947)	14 August 2014	Incumbent

=== Australia ===
No.	Portrait	Name (Birth)	Tenure	
No.	Portrait	Name (Birth)	Took office	Left office
1		David Hurley (b. 1953)	1 July 2019	1 July 2024
2		Sam Mostyn (b. 1965)	1 July 2024	Incumbent

=== The Bahamas ===
No.	Portrait	Name (Birth)	Tenure	
No.	Portrait	Name (Birth)	Took office	Left office
1		Sir Cornelius A. Smith (b. 1937)	28 June 2019	31 August 2023
2		Dame Cynthia A. Pratt (b. 1945)	1 September 2023	Incumbent

=== Belize ===
No.	Portrait	Name (Birth)	Tenure	
No.	Portrait	Name (Birth)	Took office	Left office
1		Dame Froyla Tzalam	27 May 2021	Incumbent

=== Canada ===
No.	Portrait	Name (Birth)	Tenure	
No.	Portrait	Name (Birth)	Took office	Left office
1		Mary Simon (b. 1947)	26 July 2021	8 June 2026
2		Louise Arbour (b. 1947)	8 June 2026	Incumbent

=== Grenada ===
No.	Portrait	Name (Birth)	Tenure	
No.	Portrait	Name (Birth)	Took office	Left office
1		Dame Cécile La Grenade (b. 1952)	7 May 2013	Incumbent

=== Jamaica ===
No.	Portrait	Name (Birth)	Tenure	
No.	Portrait	Name (Birth)	Took office	Left office
1		Sir Patrick Allen (b. 1951)	26 February 2009	Incumbent

=== New Zealand ===
No.	Portrait	Name (Birth)	Tenure	
No.	Portrait	Name (Birth)	Took office	Left office
1		Dame Cindy Kiro (b. 1958)	21 October 2021	Incumbent

=== Papua New Guinea ===
No.	Portrait	Name (Birth)	Tenure	
No.	Portrait	Name (Birth)	Took office	Left office
1		Sir Bob Dadae (b. 1961)	28 February 2017	Incumbent

=== Saint Kitts and Nevis ===
No.	Portrait	Name (Birth)	Tenure	
No.	Portrait	Name (Birth)	Took office	Left office
1		Sir Tapley Seaton (1950–2023)	19 May 2015	31 January 2023
2		Dame Marcella Liburd (b. 1953)	1 February 2023	Incumbent

=== Saint Lucia ===
No.	Portrait	Name (Birth)	Tenure	
No.	Portrait	Name (Birth)	Took office	Left office
1		Sir Errol Charles (b. 1942)	1 November 2024 (acting since 11 November 2021)	31 July 2026

=== Saint Vincent and the Grenadines ===
No.	Portrait	Name (Birth)	Tenure	
No.	Portrait	Name (Birth)	Took office	Left office
1		Dame Susan Dougan (b. 1955)	1 August 2019	5 January 2026
2		Sir Stanley John (b. 1951)	6 January 2026	Incumbent

=== Solomon Islands ===
No.	Portrait	Name (Birth)	Tenure	
No.	Portrait	Name (Birth)	Took office	Left office
1		Sir David Vunagi (1950–2025)	7 July 2019	7 July 2024
2		Sir David Tiva Kapu	7 July 2024	Incumbent

=== Tuvalu ===
No.	Portrait	Name (Birth)	Tenure	
No.	Portrait	Name (Birth)	Took office	Left office
1		Sir Tofiga Vaevalu Falani	29 September 2021	30 September 2026
2		Temukisa Auina Penehuro Hauma	30 September 2026	Incumbent

== See also ==
- Commonwealth of Nations
- Constitutional monarchy
- Governor-General
- List of current viceregal representatives of the Crown
- List of prime ministers of Charles III
