= Toafa =

Toafa is a given name and a surname. Notable people with the name include:

- Maatia Toafa (1954–2024), Tuvaluan politician
- Pulafagu Toafa (born c. 1960), Tuvaluan activist, wife of Maatia
- Toafa Takaniko (born 1985), French volleyball player
