= 2023 in Tuvalu =

- Decades: 2000s; 2010s; 2020s
- See also: Other events of 2023; Timeline of Tuvaluan history

Events from 2023 in Tuvalu.

== Incumbents ==
- Monarch: Charles III
- Governor-General: Sir Tofiga Vaevalu Falani
- Prime Minister: Kausea Natano

== Events ==
Ongoing – COVID-19 pandemic in Oceania; COVID-19 pandemic in Tuvalu

- 6 May – Coronation of Charles III as King of Tuvalu and the other Commonwealth realms. Governor-General Sir Tofiga Vaevalu Falani attend the ceremony in London.
- 10 November – In the Falepili Union treaty, Australia grants "special" freedom of movement and defence rights to Tuvaluans for residence and employment for climate reasons.
