= Tuvalu National Council for Women =

Women's rights organisation in Tuvalu

- Formation: 1980
- Headquarters: Funafuti
- President: Temukisa Hauma
- Co-ordinator: Lilian Falealuga Tine

Tuvalu National Council for Women (TNCW) is a Tuvaluan national council, which is the umbrella organisation for non-governmental women's rights groups in the country. The TNCW aims to enable gender equity in Tuvalu, through educational campaigns and through resourcing women to be informed about their economic, legal and social rights.

== Background ==
The work to create the Tuvalu National Council for Women (TNCW) began in the late 1970s. It was formally established in 1980 during Tuvalu's transition to independence. Initially the organisation's goals were to improve the standard of living for women, but this has expanded to include gender equity in all forms.

== Administration ==
The TNCW has a council which consists of sixteen women. Two women represent each of the islands that compose the country. It acts as a bridge between governmental and volunteer organisations and is registered as a charity. The TNCW has a staff of three: one co-ordinator and two further staff. The organisation's base is in Funafuti. As of 2023 the co-ordinator was Lilian Falealuga Tine.

Lilian Falealuga Tine was previously the Interim Coordinator of the TNCW.

== Projects ==
The TNCW has run a variety of projects, including a programme to encourage legal literacy (which began in 1999), providing training in family planning and business administration, as well as establishing the Women's Handicraft Centre, which is a nation-wide marketing system for women craftworkers, in particular for weaving. In 2006 they secured funding from the Japanese government to fund improvements to the centre. They have also run programs addressing violence against women. In 2001 the TNCW began a credit scheme where women could borrow money in order to establish small businesses such as poultry farming, pig-keeping and catering. However many loans went un-repaid.

Programmes have also been run in response to the climate crisis. These include women planting mangroves as coastal protection, as well as home gardening projects and consultancy and education work. In 2016 the TNCW worked with the Green Climate Fund to enable women from the islands of Nanumea and Nanumaga to be part of talks about climate crisis. One their key issues was the additional burden of social care than women take on in the aftermath of natural disasters. In 2020 they co-ordinated the events for International Women's Day, which included a church service and hymn competition.

== Finance ==
Until 2011, the TNCW's annual budget was 10,000 AUS dollars, however that year it was cut by 50% – a trend that continued in 2012. The government stated that the reduction in support was as a response to the 2008 financial crisis.

== Leadership ==
=== Presidents ===
The president leads the Tuvalu National Council of Women, represents women’s interests to the government, and oversees the council’s work promoting women’s rights and equality in Tuvalu. The following are known to have held the office since the role was created:

President	Term	Notes
Office not in use	1980–1993	
Suliana Seluka	1993–2006	
Katalaina Malua	2006–2016	
Temukisa Hauma	2016–present	

=== Co-ordinators ===
The coordinator manages the day-to-day work of the Tuvalu National Council of Women, coordinates its programmes and staff, and helps connect the council with the government and women’s organisations across Tuvalu. The following are known to have held the office since the role was created:

Coordinator	Term	Notes
Lita Pita	Unknown–2006	
Pulafagu Toafa	2006–2021	
Lilian Falealuga Tine	Interim; 2021–2022	
Pula Fangu	2022–2023	
Lilian Falealuga Tine	2023–present	
