= 2020 in Tuvalu =

- Decades: 2000s; 2010s; 2020s
- See also: Other events of 2020; Timeline of Tuvaluan history

Events from 2020 in Tuvalu.

== Incumbents ==
- Monarch: Elizabeth II
- Governor-General: Teniku Talesi
- Prime Minister: Kausea Natano

== Events ==
Ongoing – COVID-19 pandemic in Oceania

- 26 March – Governor-General Iakoba Italeli declared a state of emergency in response to the growing threat of COVID-19.
- 3 April – Despite there being no cases in the country, visitors were banned from landing in the country without first undergoing 14 days of isolation in a third party state.
