= 2025 in Tuvalu =

- Decades: 2000s; 2010s; 2020s
- See also: Other events of 2025; Timeline of Tuvaluan history

Events from 2025 in Tuvalu.

== Incumbents ==
- Monarch: Charles III
- Governor-General: Sir Tofiga Vaevalu Falani
- Prime Minister: Feleti Teo

== Events ==
- April 16 - Tuvalu unveils its first cash machines.

== Holidays ==
- 1 January - New Year's Day
- 10 March - Commonwealth Day
- 18 April - Good Friday
- 19 April - Easter Saturday
- 21 April - Easter Monday
- 12 May - Gospel Day
- 14 June – King's Birthday
- 4 August – National Children's Day
- 1–2 October – Tuvalu Day Holiday
- 25 December - Christmas Day
- 26 December – Boxing Day
