= Responses to the COVID-19 pandemic in May 2022 =

Aspect of viral disease pandemic

This article documents the chronology of the response to the COVID-19 pandemic in May 2022, which originated in Wuhan, China in December 2019. Some developments may become known or fully understood only in retrospect. Reporting on this pandemic began in December 2019.

== Reactions and measures in Europe ==
=== 11 May ===
- The European Union Aviation Safety Agency (EASA) has announced plans to lift facemask requirements for flights and airports throughout the European Union in mid-May 2022.

== Reactions and measures in the Western Pacific ==
=== 3 May ===
- New Zealand's COVID-19 Response Minister Chris Hipkins announced that unvaccinated visa holders, permanent residents, and Australian citizens residing in New Zealand would be able to travel to and from New Zealand without entering Managed Isolation and Quarantine (MIQ) facilities.
- The New Zealand Government announced that the country's four remaining MIQ facilities would close by August 2022 due to the low number of people using them.

=== 11 May ===
- Prime Minister of New Zealand Jacinda Ardern announced that the country's border would reopen for all work visas on 4 July and to all visitor and student visa and cruise ships on 31 July.

== See also ==
- Timeline of the COVID-19 pandemic in May 2022
- Responses to the COVID-19 pandemic
