= Temukisa Auina Penehuro Hauma =

Governor-General of Tuvalu from 2026

Her Excellency Temukisa Auina Penehuro Hauma

11th Governor-General of Tuvalu
- Incumbent
- Assumed office 30 September 2026
- Monarch: Charles III
- Prime Minister: Feleti Teo
- Preceded by: Tofiga Vaevalu Falani

President of the Tuvalu National Council of Women
- Incumbent
- Assumed office 2016
- Preceded by: Katalaina Malua

Personal details
- Born: c. 1955 (age 70–71) Tuvalu
- Education: University of the South Pacific
- Occupation: Educator
- Known for: First woman Governor-General of Tuvalu

Temukisa Auina Penehuro Hauma (born c. 1955) is a Tuvaluan educator and public figure who has served as the Governor-General of Tuvalu since 30 September 2026. She is the first woman to hold the office.

Hauma has more than three decades of experience in education and community leadership. Before becoming Governor-General, she worked as a teacher and school administrator and served for 12 years as a headmistress. She holds a Bachelor of Education degree from the University of the South Pacific and a Master of Business Administration degree.

== Early life and education ==
Hauma is associated with the Tuvaluan islands of Vaitupu and Nanumaga. She pursued a career in education and studied at the University of the South Pacific, where she obtained a Bachelor of Education. She later obtained a Master of Business Administration.

== Career ==
Hauma spent more than 30 years working in education, including 12 years as a headmistress. Her career included senior roles within Tuvalu's education system. In the mid-2000s, she was identified as the Head Teacher of Nauti Primary School in Funafuti in Tuvalu's reporting to the United Nations Committee on the Elimination of Discrimination against Women.

Hauma was also associated with Fetuvalu Secondary School in Funafuti. A 2010 record from the University of the South Pacific lists Penehuro Hauma among participants associated with Fetuvalu Secondary School, while later educational records identify Penehuro Hauma as the school's principal.

In addition to her work in schools, Hauma was involved in national education and social-policy initiatives. She was a member of the task force involved in preparing Tuvalu's report under the Convention on the Elimination of All Forms of Discrimination against Women. Hauma has been involved in community organisations and women's affairs in Tuvalu. She became President of the Tuvalu National Council of Women from 2016 and continued in that position even after her appointment as Governor-General in September 2026.

She has also participated in national initiatives including the review of the Constitution of Tuvalu and work towards the development of a Tuvaluan dictionary.

== Governor-General of Tuvalu ==
On 30 September 2026, Hauma was sworn in as the Governor-General of Tuvalu at Niutao Hall in Funafuti, succeeding Tofiga Vaevalu Falani. Her appointment made her the first woman to serve as Governor-General of Tuvalu.

The oath of office and oath of allegiance were administered by Acting Chief Justice John Muria. As Governor-General, Hauma serves as the representative of Charles III, King of Tuvalu, and is the country's constitutional head of state.

Hauma began a four-year term in office. In her first remarks after taking office, she said that she looked forward to leading the country and empowering the people of Tuvalu, particularly women.

Her inauguration took place on the eve of Tuvalu's 48th anniversary of independence on 1 October 1978. The ceremony included a Guard of Honour and General Salute by the Tuvalu Police Service, followed by celebrations involving communities connected with Vaitupu and Nanumaga.

== Personal life ==
Hauma has family connections to both Vaitupu and Nanumaga.

== See also ==
- Governor-General of Tuvalu
- List of governors-general of Tuvalu
- Women in Tuvalu
- Politics of Tuvalu
