= 2024 in Tuvalu =

- Decades: 2000s; 2010s; 2020s
- See also: Other events of 2024; Timeline of Tuvaluan history

Events from 2024 in Tuvalu.

== Incumbents ==
- Monarch: Charles III
- Governor-General: Sir Tofiga Vaevalu Falani
- Prime Minister: Kausea Natano (until 26 February); Feleti Teo onwards

== Events ==
- 26 January – 2024 Tuvaluan general election: Voters participate in the general election for the 16 members of parliament.
- 27 January – Incumbent prime minister Kausea Natano loses his seat in parliament.
- 26 February – 2024 Tuvaluan general election: Feleti Teo is elected unopposed as the new Prime Minister of Tuvalu.
- 9 May – Australia and Tuvalu sign a new security agreement revising a previous one made under the Natano government over sovereignty concerns.
- 1 October – Climate minister Maina Talia denounces the Australian government's decision to expand three coal mines as an existential threat to the nation, due to the role of the mines in causing rising sea levels that have forced mass displacement across Tuvalu's low-lying islands.

== Holidays ==
- 1 January - New Year's Day
- 11 March - Commonwealth Day
- 29 March - Good Friday
- 30 March - Easter Saturday
- 1 April - Easter Monday
- 13 May - Gospel Day
- 8 June – King's Birthday
- 5 August – National Children's Day
- 1–2 October – Tuvalu Day Holiday
- 25 December - Christmas Day
- 26 December – Boxing Day
