= List of prime ministers of Charles III =

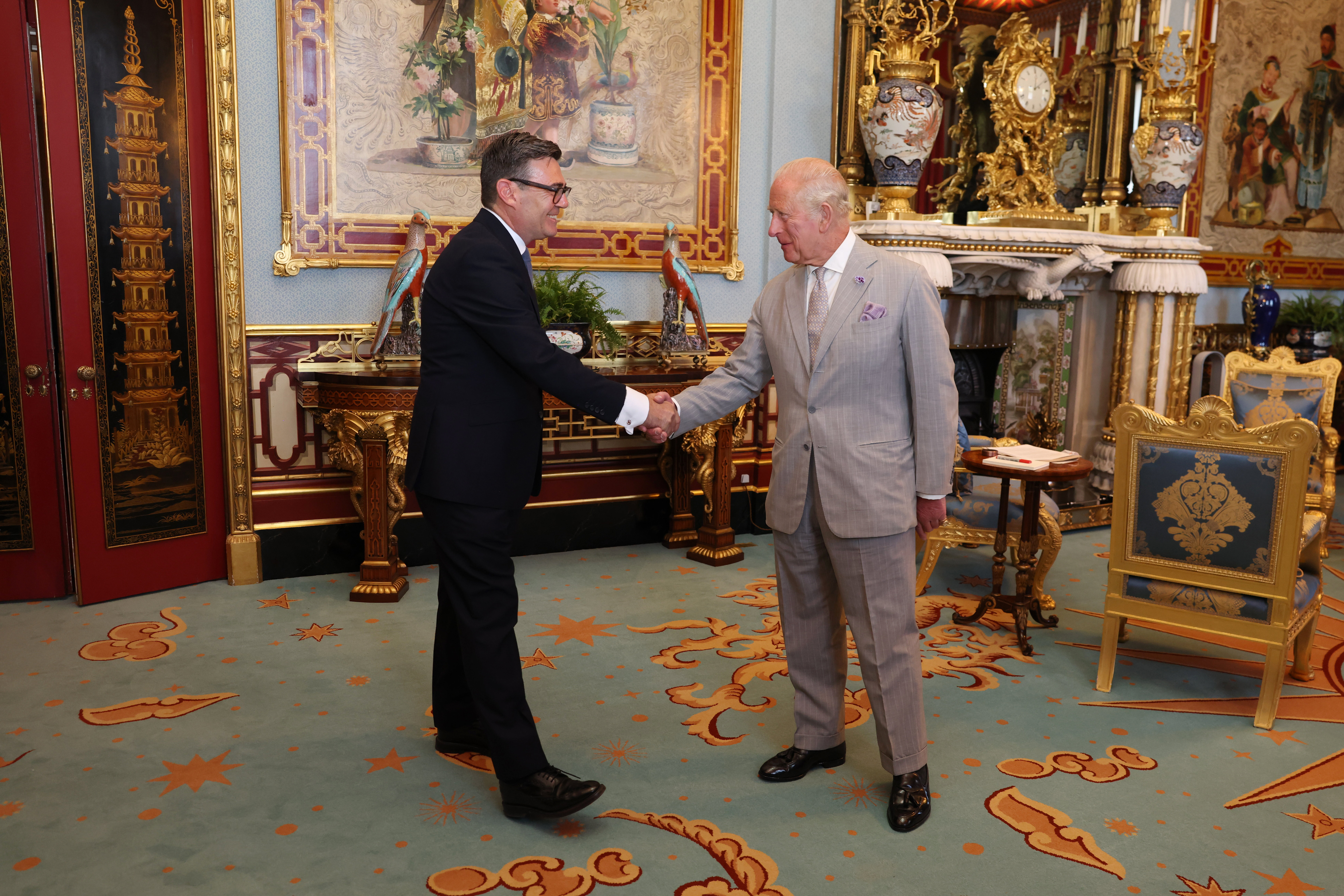
Charles III receiving Andy Burnham at Buckingham Palace to invite him to form a government, in 2026

Charles III is head of state of 15 Commonwealth realms and has had 25 prime ministers since acceding to the throne on 8 September 2022. Within the Westminster system in each realm, the King's government is headed by a prime minister. Appointment and dismissal of prime ministers are common reserve powers that can be exercised by the King or his governors-general. To date, nine prime ministers have been appointed during the reign of Charles III, the first being Rishi Sunak as Prime Minister of the United Kingdom on 25 October 2022 and the most recent being Andy Burnham as Prime Minister of United Kingdom on 20 July 2026.

This list does not cover Commonwealth nations that are not Commonwealth realms, as Charles is not head of state in these nations. Nor does it cover holders of offices of prime minister in sub-national entities such as states, dependencies, or provinces.

== List of prime ministers ==
=== Antigua and Barbuda ===
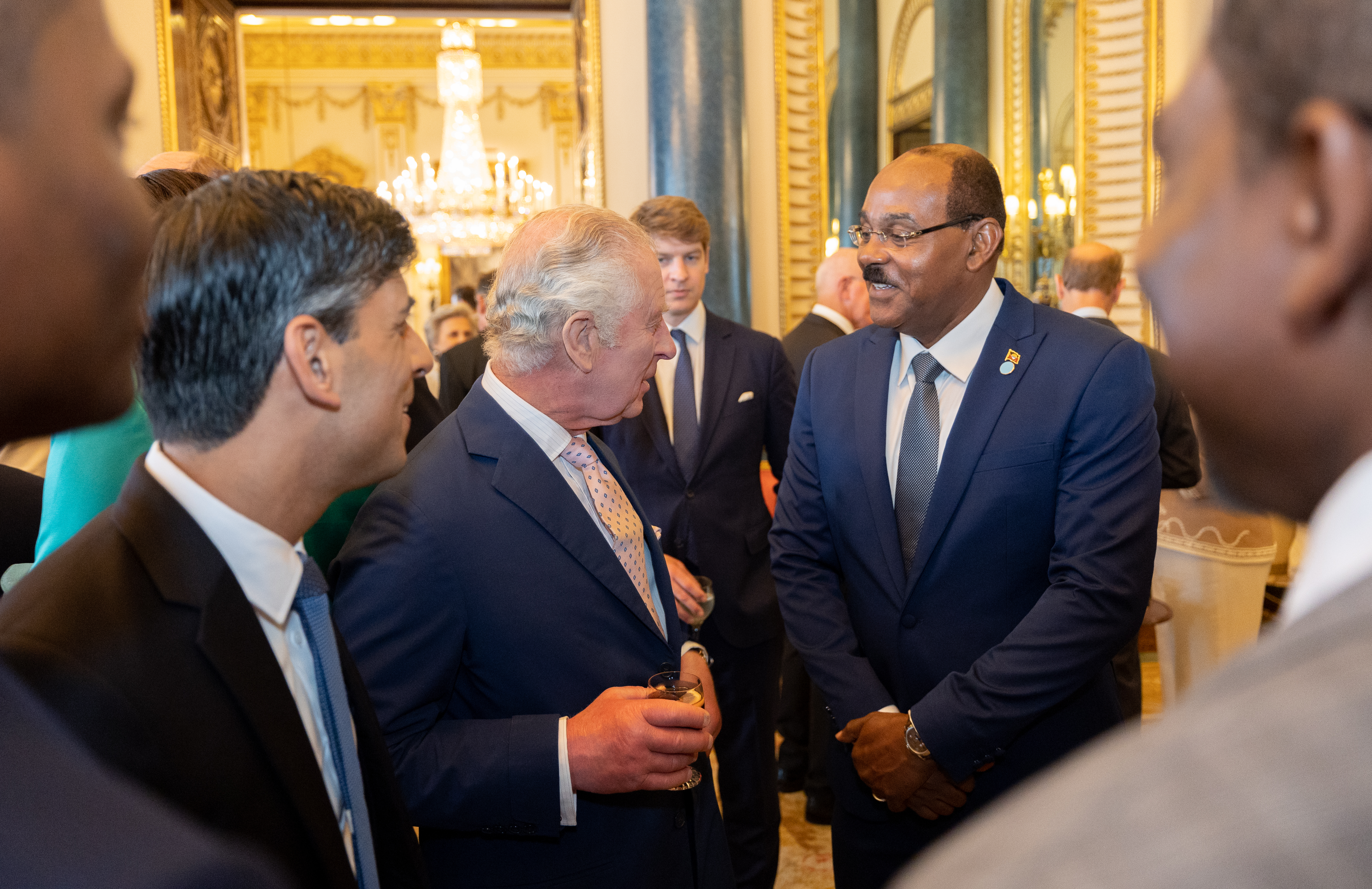
Charles III with Prime Minister Gaston Browne at Buckingham Palace, in 2023

No.	Portrait	Name (Birth)	Tenure	
No.	Portrait	Name (Birth)	Took office	Left office
1		Gaston Browne (b. 1967)	13 June 2014	Incumbent

=== Australia ===
No.	Portrait	Name (Birth)	Tenure	
No.	Portrait	Name (Birth)	Took office	Left office
1		Anthony Albanese (b. 1963)	23 May 2022	Incumbent

=== The Bahamas ===
No.	Portrait	Name (Birth)	Tenure	
No.	Portrait	Name (Birth)	Took office	Left office
1		Philip Davis (b. 1951)	17 September 2021	Incumbent

=== Belize ===
No.	Portrait	Name (Birth)	Tenure	
No.	Portrait	Name (Birth)	Took office	Left office
1		Johnny Briceño (b. 1960)	12 November 2020	Incumbent

=== Canada ===
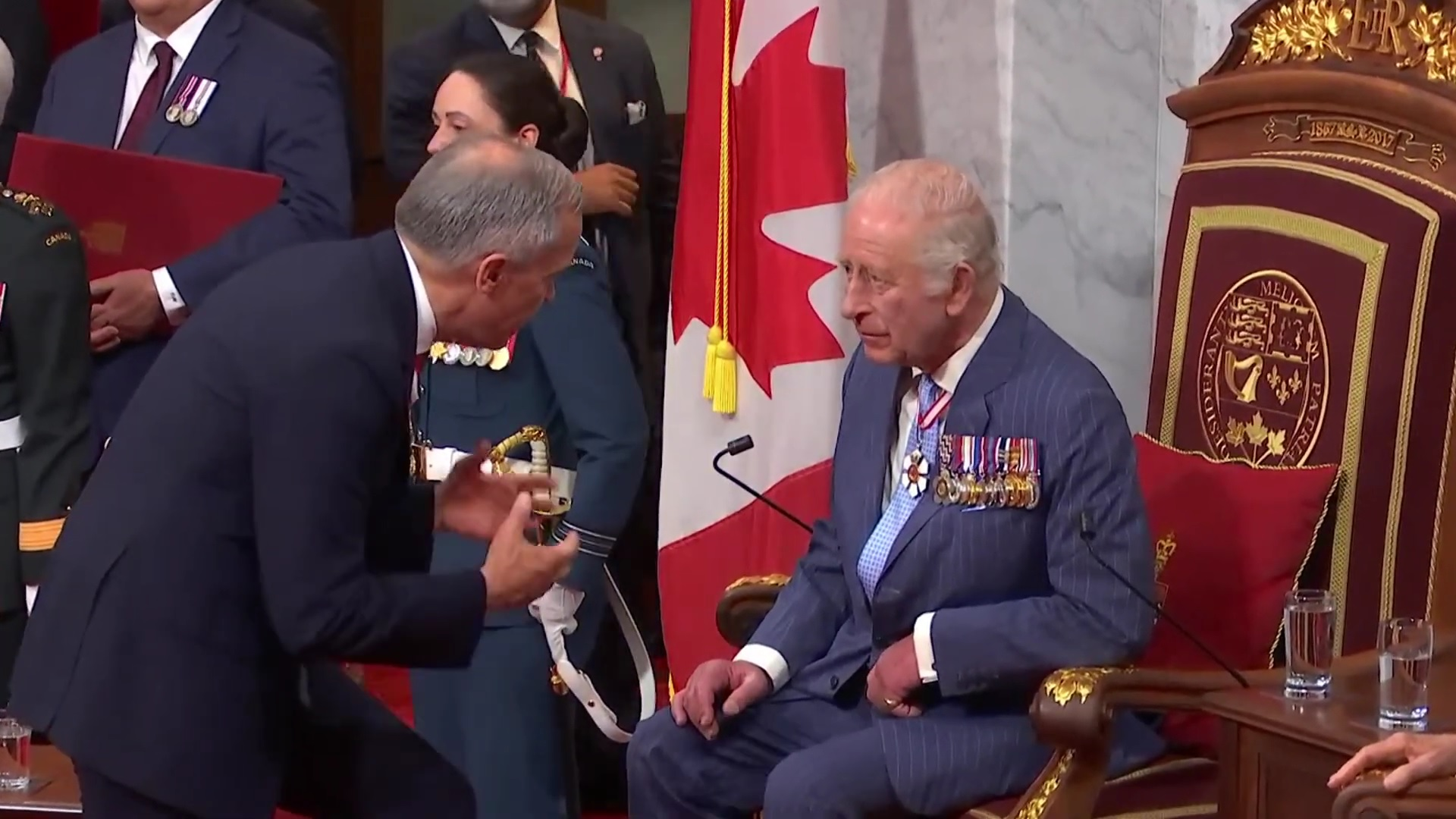
Charles III with Prime Minister Mark Carney during the 2025 Speech from the Throne

No.	Portrait	Name (Birth)	Tenure	
No.	Portrait	Name (Birth)	Took office	Left office
1		Justin Trudeau (b. 1971)	4 November 2015	14 March 2025
2		Mark Carney (b. 1965)	14 March 2025	Incumbent

=== Grenada ===
No.	Portrait	Name (Birth)	Tenure	
No.	Portrait	Name (Birth)	Took office	Left office
1		Dickon Mitchell (b. 1978)	24 June 2022	Incumbent

=== Jamaica ===
No.	Portrait	Name (Birth)	Tenure	
No.	Portrait	Name (Birth)	Took office	Left office
1		Andrew Holness (b. 1972)	3 March 2016	Incumbent

=== New Zealand ===
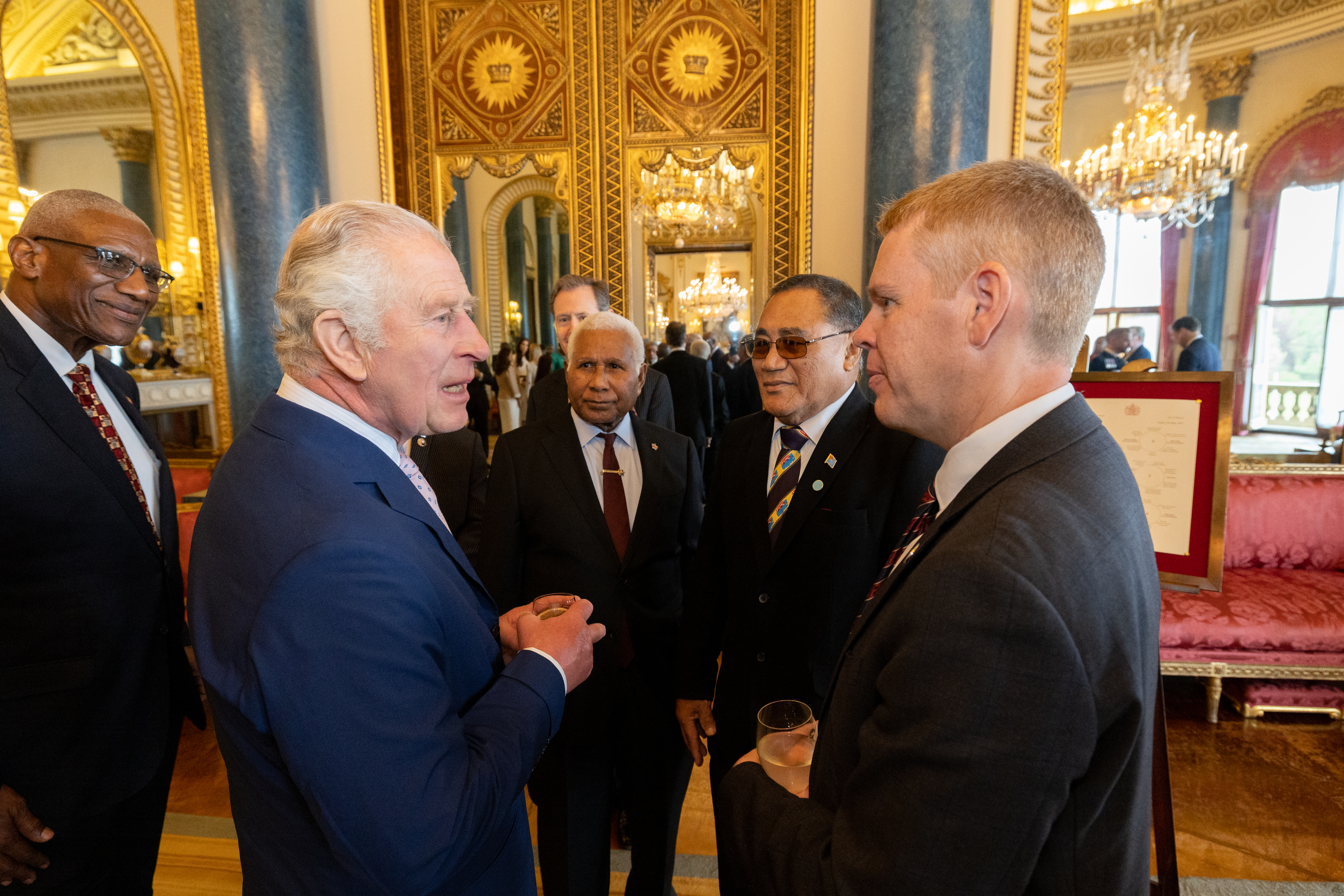
Charles III with Prime Minister Christopher Hipkins at Buckingham Palace, in 2023

No.	Portrait	Name (Birth)	Tenure	
No.	Portrait	Name (Birth)	Took office	Left office
1		Jacinda Ardern (b. 1980)	26 October 2017	25 January 2023
2		Chris Hipkins (b. 1978)	25 January 2023	27 November 2023
3		Christopher Luxon (b. 1970)	27 November 2023	Incumbent

=== Papua New Guinea ===
No.	Portrait	Name (Birth)	Tenure	
No.	Portrait	Name (Birth)	Took office	Left office
1		James Marape (b. 1971)	30 May 2019	Incumbent

=== Saint Kitts and Nevis ===
No.	Portrait	Name (Birth)	Tenure	
No.	Portrait	Name (Birth)	Took office	Left office
1		Terrance Drew (b. 1976)	6 August 2022	Incumbent

=== Saint Lucia ===
No.	Portrait	Name (Birth)	Tenure	
No.	Portrait	Name (Birth)	Took office	Left office
1		Philip Pierre (b. 1954)	28 July 2021	Incumbent

=== Saint Vincent and the Grenadines ===
No.	Portrait	Name (Birth)	Tenure	
No.	Portrait	Name (Birth)	Took office	Left office
1		Ralph Gonsalves (b. 1946)	29 March 2001	28 November 2025
2		Godwin Friday (b. 1959)	28 November 2025	Incumbent

=== Solomon Islands ===
No.	Portrait	Name (Birth)	Tenure	
No.	Portrait	Name (Birth)	Took office	Left office
1		Manasseh Sogavare (b. 1955)	24 April 2019	2 May 2024
2		Jeremiah Manele (b. 1968)	2 May 2024	15 May 2026
3		Matthew Wale (b.1968)	15 May 2026	Incumbent

=== Tuvalu ===
No.	Portrait	Name (Birth)	Tenure	
No.	Portrait	Name (Birth)	Took office	Left office
1		Kausea Natano (b. 1957)	19 September 2019	26 February 2024
2		Feleti Teo (b. 1962)	26 February 2024	Incumbent

=== United Kingdom ===
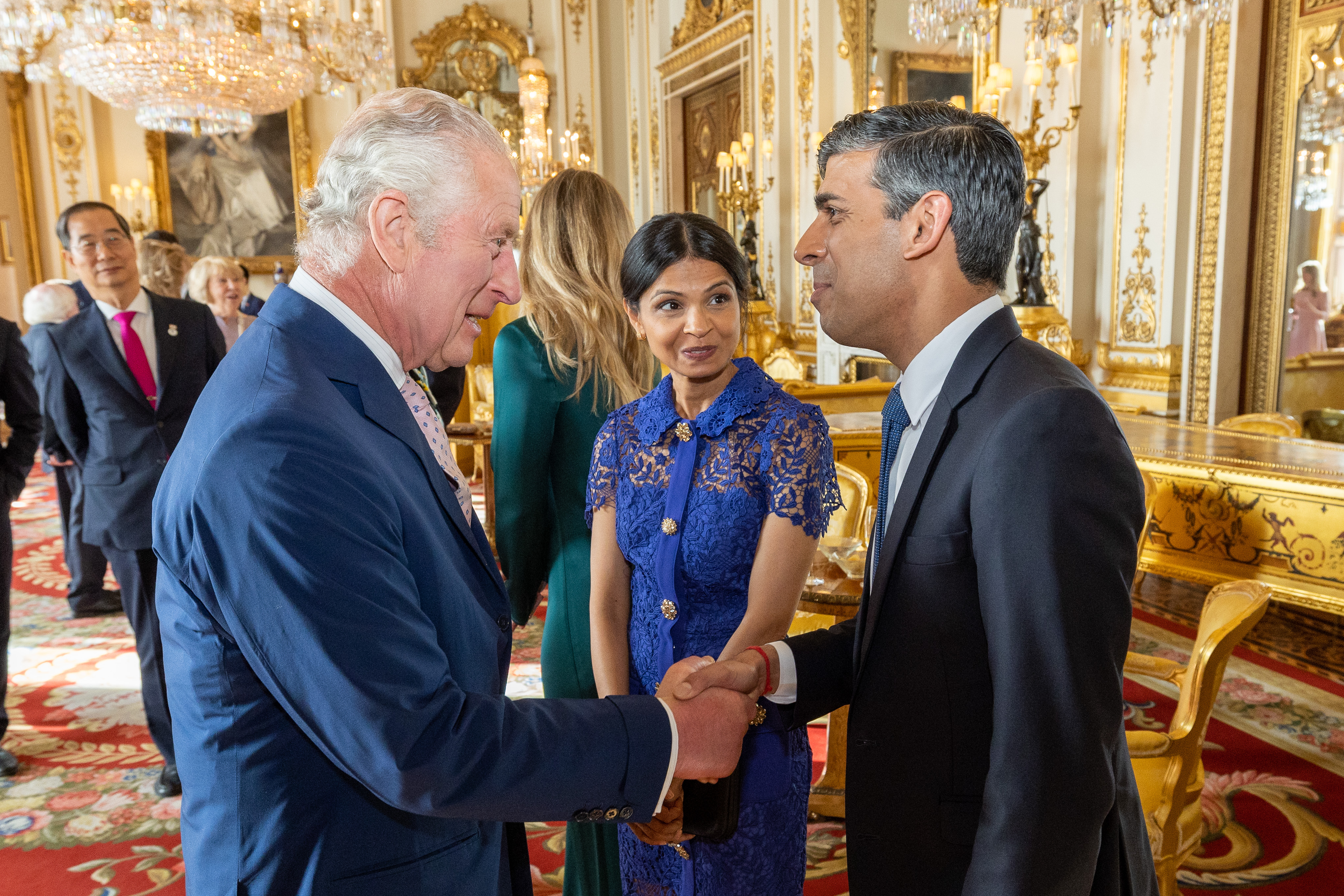
Charles III with British Prime Minister Rishi Sunak, in 2023

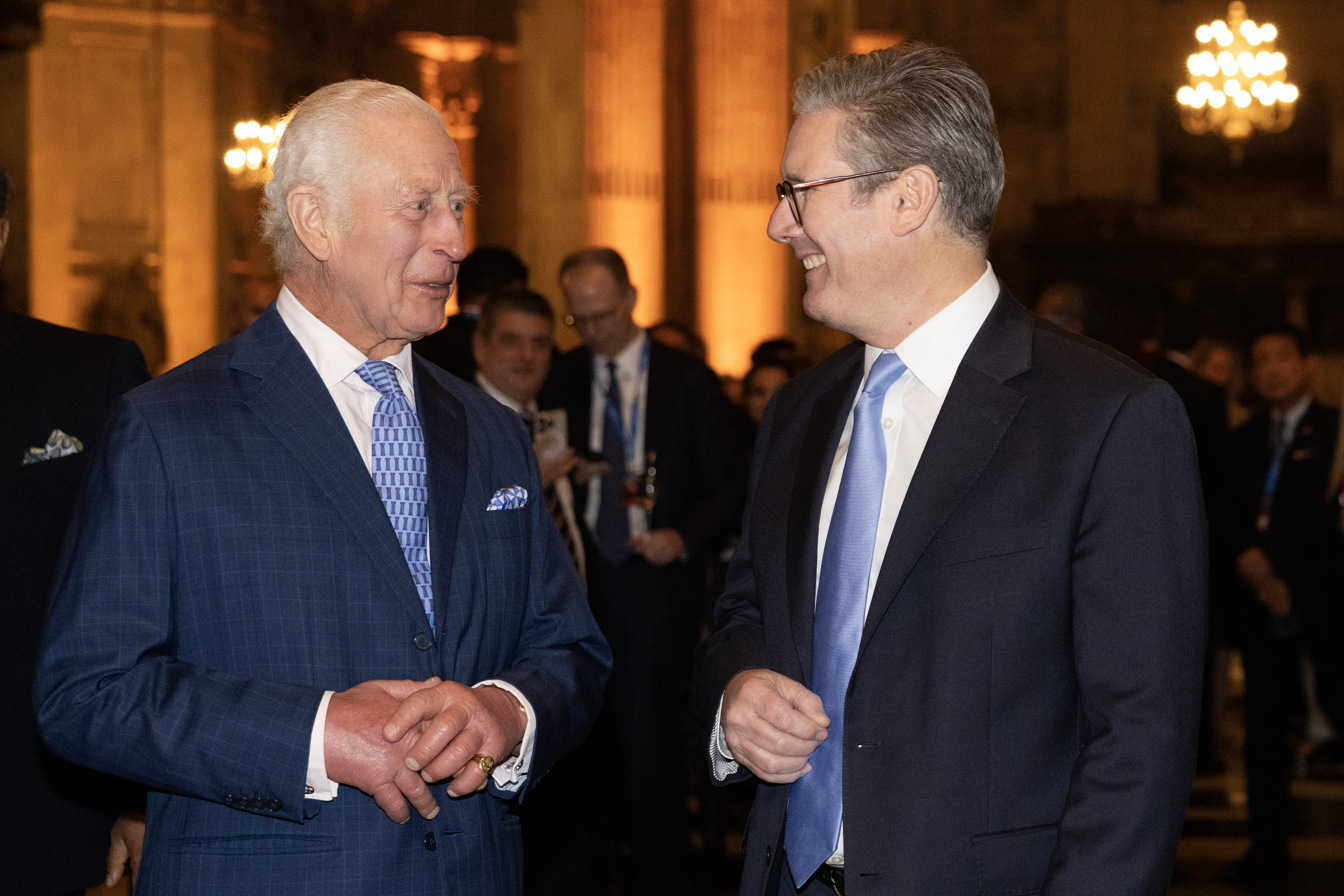
Charles III with British Prime Minister Keir Starmer, in 2024

No.	Portrait	Name (Birth)	Tenure	
No.	Portrait	Name (Birth)	Took office	Left office
1		Liz Truss (b. 1975)	6 September 2022	25 October 2022
2		Rishi Sunak (b. 1980)	25 October 2022	5 July 2024
3		Keir Starmer (b. 1962)	5 July 2024	20 July 2026
4		Andy Burnham (b. 1970)	20 July 2026	Incumbent

== See also ==
- Commonwealth of Nations
- Constitutional monarchy
- List of Commonwealth heads of government
- List of governors-general of Charles III
