= Pulafagu Toafa =

Tuvaluan activist

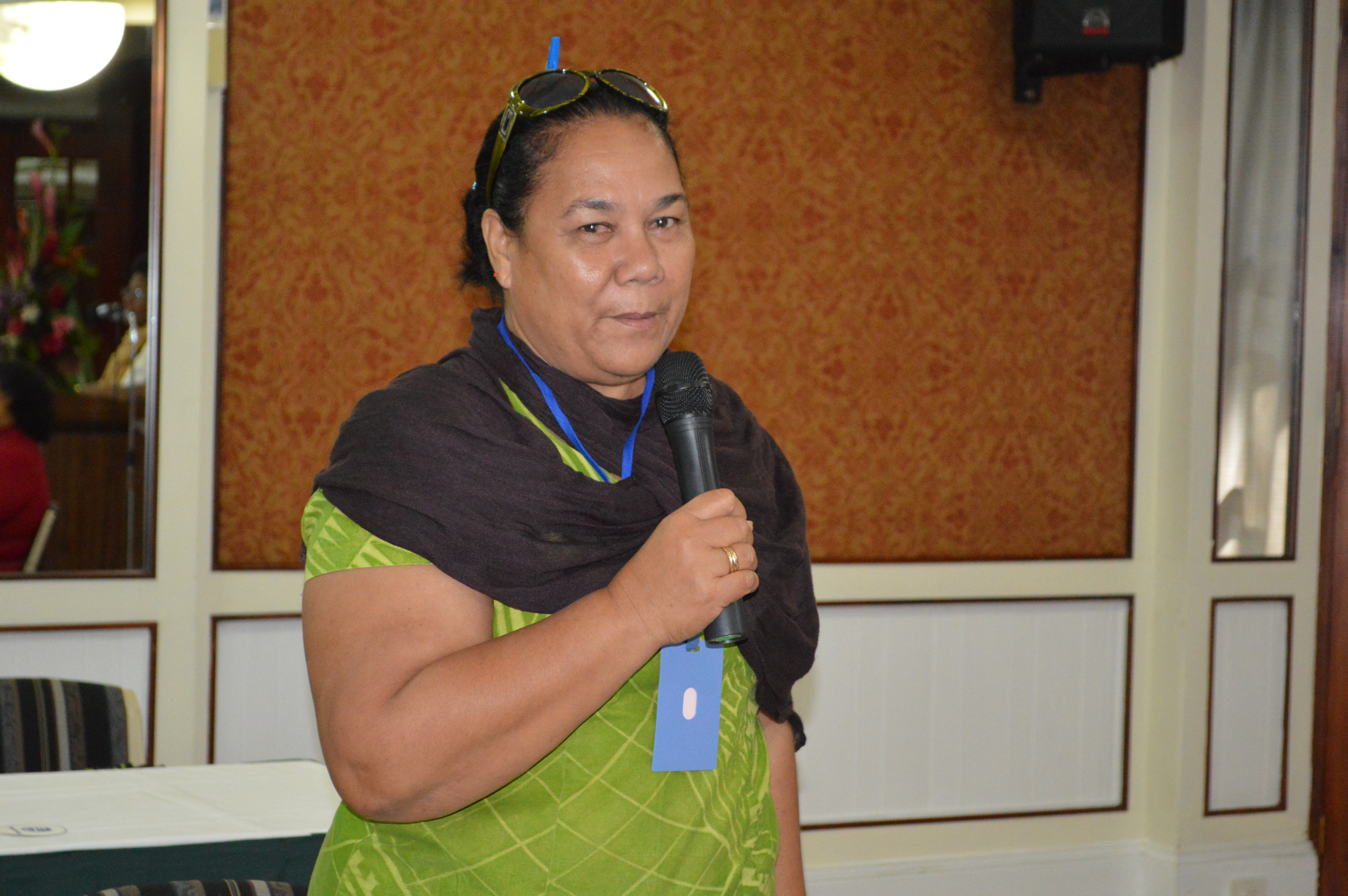
- Pulafagu Toafa in 2013
- Education: University of the South Pacific
- Occupation: Coordinator of the Tuvalu National Council for Women
- Spouse: Maatia Toafa

Pulafagu Toafa (born c. 1960) is a women's rights activist in Tuvalu. For over a decade, she has led the Tuvalu National Council for Women, the country's umbrella women's rights organization.

== Biography ==
Pulafagu Toafa was born around 1960 in Tuvalu. She earned a bachelor's in history, political science, and sociology from the University of the South Pacific in Fiji.

Toafa worked for Radio Tuvalu, later serving on the board of its parent organization, the Tuvalu Media Corporation. She also ran an internet cafe and worked as a researcher for the country's Department of Women's Affairs.

For more than a decade, she has served as the coordinator of the Tuvalu National Council for Women, the umbrella organization for women's rights groups in the country. In this role, she has advocated for women's empowerment in Tuvalu's political processes, including the Falekaupule, and raised other issues that affect women and girls, particularly surrounding climate change. She also runs an anti-domestic violence program.

In 2015, Toafa served as a delegate from Tuvalu to the Paris climate talks.

She is married to Maatia Toafa, a former prime minister of Tuvalu.
