= Katalaina Malua =

Katalaina Malua BEM, also known by her married name Katalaina Kokea, was a Tuvaluan women's rights advocate. She is President of the Tuvalu National Council for Women (TNCW).

== Life ==
Katalaina Malua trained at the Community Education and Training Centre in Suva, Fiji, graduating in 1974. She married a pharmacist.

In the 1981 New Year Honours she received the British Empire Medal for "services to the Women's Interest Section of the Ministry for Social Services".

In 2002 Malua called for women to play a greater role in the Tuvaluan political process. Later that year she was among a delegation accompanying Tomasi Puapua to the United Nations in New York.
