= COVID-19 pandemic in Tuvalu =

Ongoing viral pandemic

- Disease: COVID-19
- Pathogen: SARS-CoV-2
- Location: Tuvalu
- First outbreak: Wuhan, China
- Arrival date: 20 May 2022
- Confirmed cases: 2,943
- Deaths: 1
- Fatality rate: 0.03%
- Vaccinations: 9,505 (fully vaccinated)

The COVID-19 pandemic in Tuvalu was part of the worldwide pandemic of coronavirus disease 2019 (COVID-19) caused by severe acute respiratory syndrome coronavirus 2 (SARS-CoV-2). The virus was confirmed to have reached Tuvalu on 20 May 2022. As of 31 August 2022, a total of 25,591 vaccine doses have been administered.

== Background ==
On 12 January 2020, the World Health Organization (WHO) confirmed that a novel coronavirus was the cause of a respiratory illness in a cluster of people in Wuhan, Hubei Province, China, which was reported to the WHO on 31 December 2019.

The case fatality ratio for COVID-19 has been much lower than SARS of 2003, but the transmission has been significantly greater, with a significant total death toll.

== Timeline ==
Cases

Deaths

Circa 26 March 2020, the acting governor general declared a state of emergency. As of 24 August 2021 in reporting to the WHO, there had been zero confirmed COVID-19 cases; and as of 15 August, 4,772 vaccines doses had been administered. On 2 November, a traveller from Tuvalu tested positive when arriving to New Zealand, suggesting possible spread of the virus in the country, but no cases had been officially reported by the local authorities of the country.

Acting Prime Minister Minute Alapati Taupo on 20 May 2022 announced that three cases were detected in quarantine, while other three cases were suspicious. On 31 October, 140 positives cases were reported by the WHO. On 3 November, the government of Tuvalu announced the first community outbreak.

In 2023, the IMF Article IV consultation with Tuvalu concluded that a successful vaccination strategy allowed Tuvalu to lift coronavirus disease (COVID-19) containment measures at the end of 2022.

== Statistics ==
=== Cases by islands and atolls (as of December 2022) ===
Island/Atoll	Cases	Deaths
Funafuti	2,300	0
Nanumea	25	0
Niulakita	2	0
Niutao	23	0
Nui	121	0
Nukufetau	73	0
Nukulaelae	25	0
Vaitupu	210	0
Total	2,779	0
