= Monarchy of Tuvalu =

King of Tuvalu
- Coat of arms of Tuvalu

Incumbent
- Charles III since 8 September 2022

Details
- Style: His Majesty
- Heir apparent: William, Prince of Wales
- First monarch: Elizabeth II
- Formed: 1 October 1978; 48 years ago

The monarchy of Tuvalu is a system of government in which a hereditary monarch is the sovereign and head of state of Tuvalu. The current Tuvaluan monarch and head of state, since 8 September 2022, is King Charles III. As sovereign, he is the personal embodiment of the Tuvaluan Crown. Although the person of the sovereign is equally shared with 14 other independent countries within the Commonwealth of Nations, each country's monarchy is separate and legally distinct. As a result, the current monarch is officially titled King of Tuvalu and, in this capacity, he and other members of the royal family undertake public and private functions domestically and abroad as representatives of the Tuvaluan state. However, the King is the only member of the royal family with any constitutional role.

All executive authority is vested in the monarch, and royal assent is required for the Tuvaluan Parliament to enact laws and for letters patent and Orders in Council to have legal effect. Most of the powers are exercised by the elected members of parliament, the ministers of the Crown generally drawn from amongst them, and the judges and justices of the peace. Other powers vested in the monarch, such as dismissal of a prime minister, are significant but are treated only as reserve powers and as an important security part of the role of the monarchy.

The sovereign is recognised in the Constitution of Tuvalu as a symbol of the unity and identity of Tuvalu. The Crown primarily functions as a guarantor of continuous and stable governance and a nonpartisan safeguard against the abuse of power. While some powers are exercisable only by the sovereign, most of the monarch's operational and ceremonial duties are exercised by his representative, the governor-general of Tuvalu.

== Origin ==
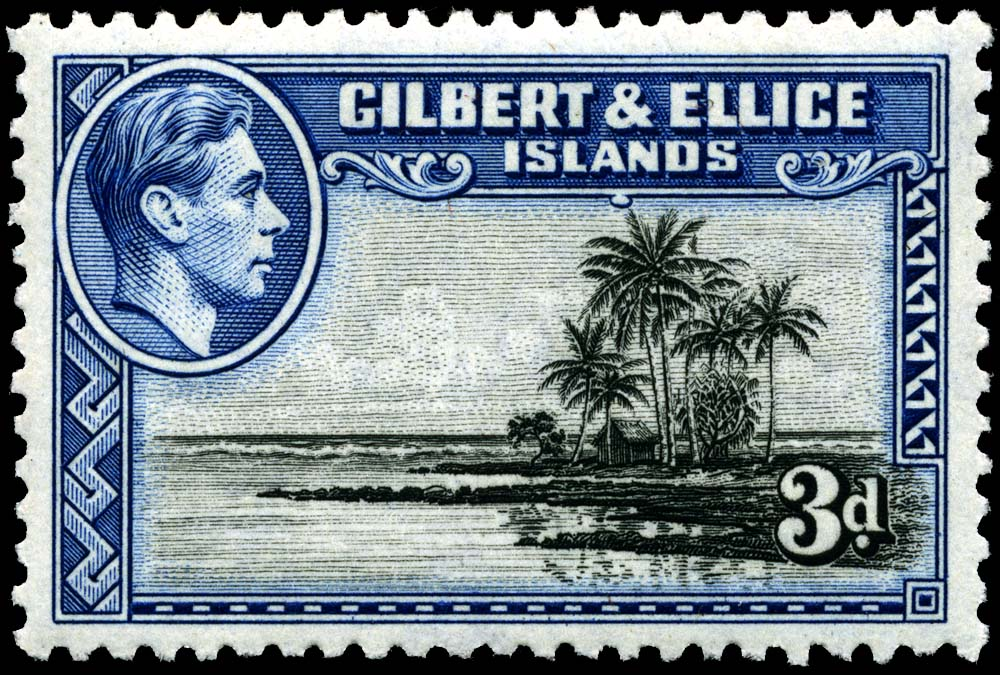
A 1939 Gilbert and Ellice Islands stamp featuring King George VI

The Ellice Islands became a British protectorate under the Western Pacific High Commission in 1892. They were administered via a resident commissioner based in the Gilbert Islands and later as part of the combined Gilbert and Ellice Islands Colony from 1916.

From the 1960s, racial tensions and rivalries over employment emerged between Gilbertese and Ellice Islanders, who were of Polynesian and Micronesian origin respectively and spoke different languages. Ellice Islanders' demands for secession resulted in a referendum in 1974, which led to the separation of the Gilbert Islands and the Ellice Islands. The Ellice Islands were renamed as "Tuvalu", by the Tuvaluan Order 1975, which took effect on 1 October 1975 and recognised Tuvalu as a separate British dependency with its own government. On 1 January 1976, separate administrations were created out of the civil service of the Gilbert and Ellice Islands Colony.

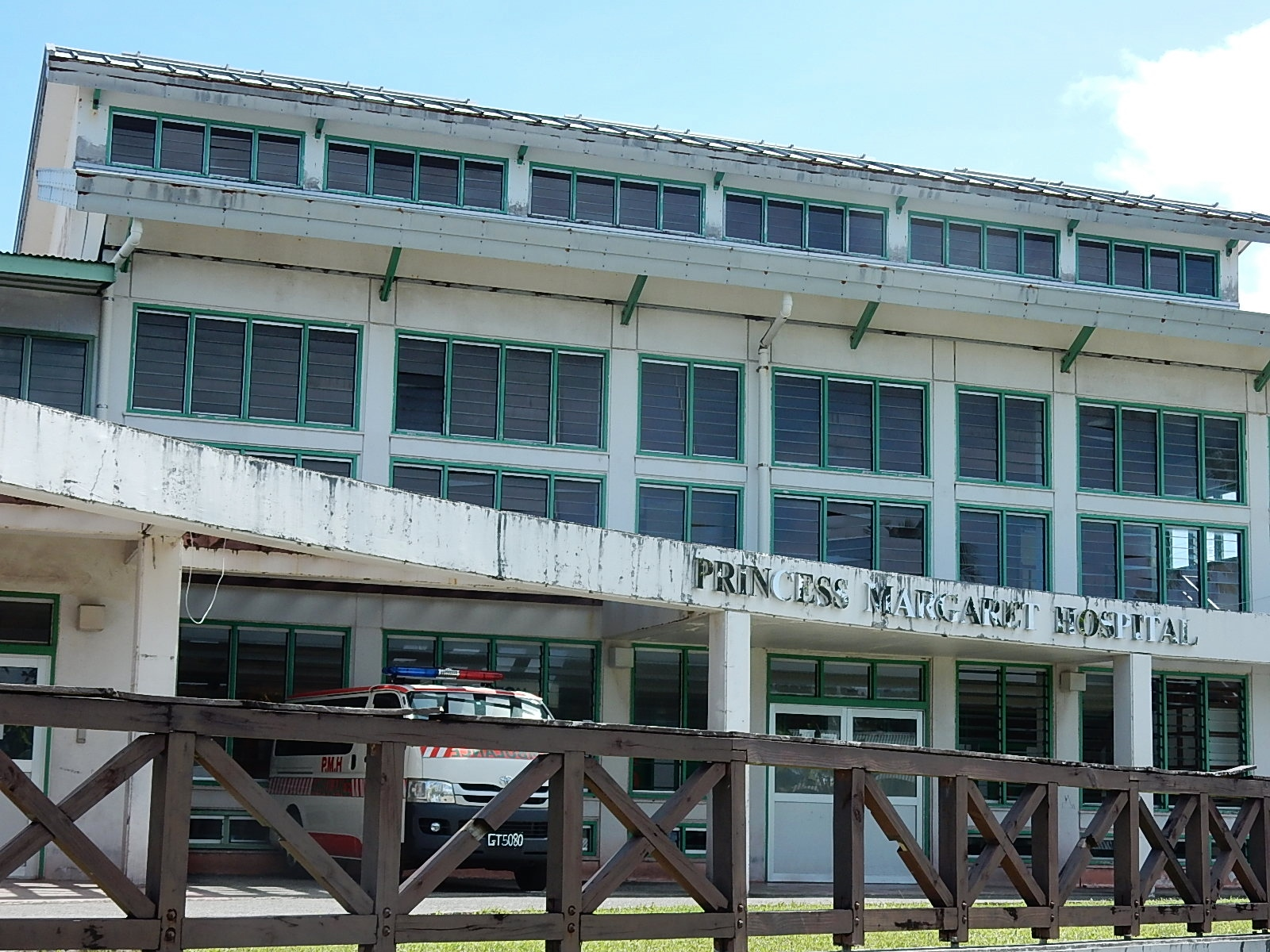
Princess Margaret Hospital, Funafuti, the only hospital in the country, is named after Princess Margaret, who officially opened the building in September 1978.

Tuvalu achieved full independence in 1978 as a sovereign state and an independent constitutional monarchy within the Commonwealth, with Elizabeth II as Queen of Tuvalu. The independence constitution provided that Queen Elizabeth II was, at the "request of the people of Tuvalu", the sovereign and head of state of the country.

Princess Margaret arrived in September 1978 to represent the Queen at the independence celebrations. Her visit was cut short, however, as she was suffering from viral pneumonia; her Private Secretary, Lord Napier, had to take her place at the ceremony. On independence day, 1 October, Lord Napier handed over the instruments of independence to the new Governor-General and read out the Princess's speech, while the Queen's Commissioner, Tom Layng, read the Queen's message to the people of Tuvalu.

== The Tuvaluan Crown and its aspects ==
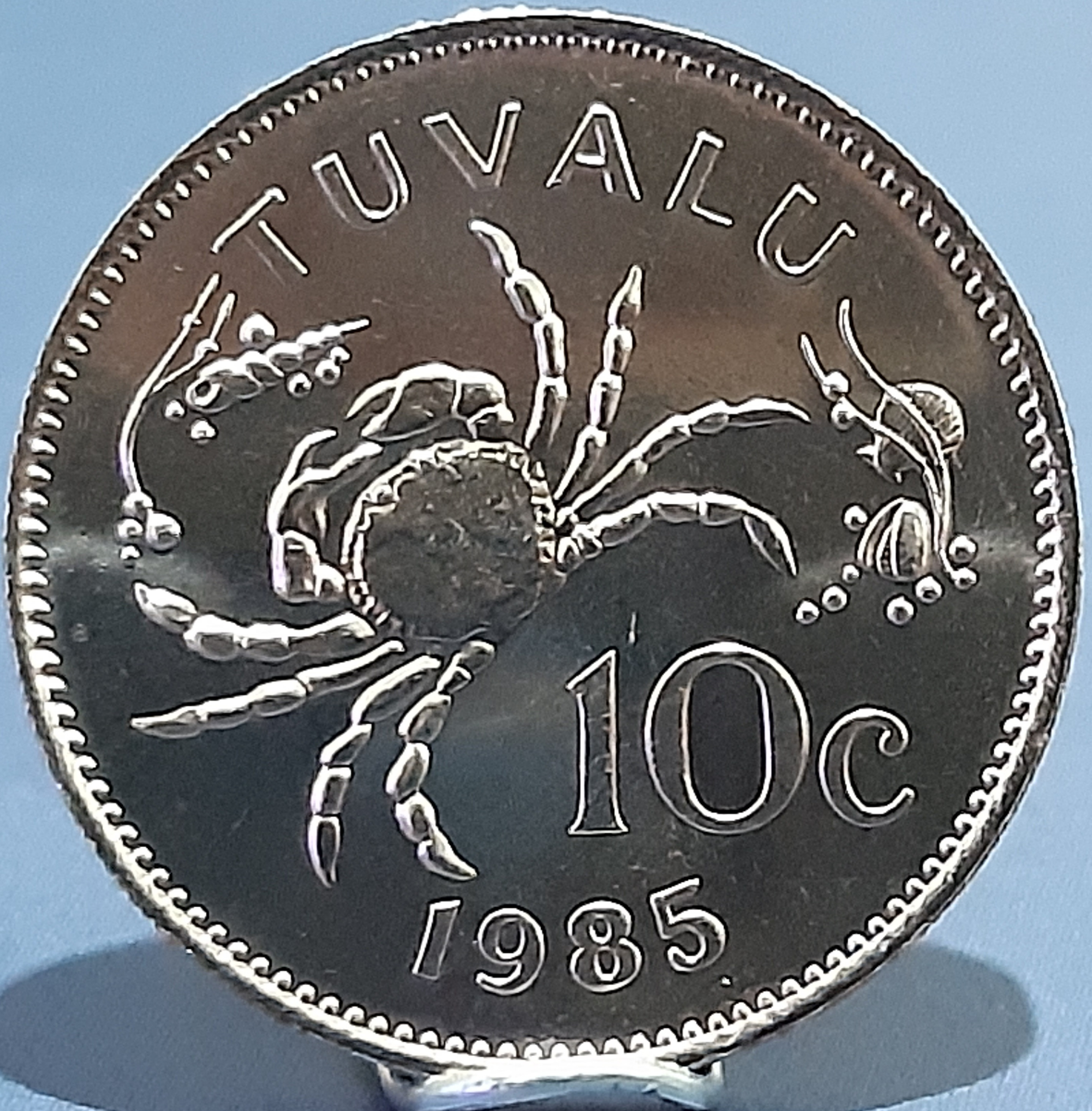
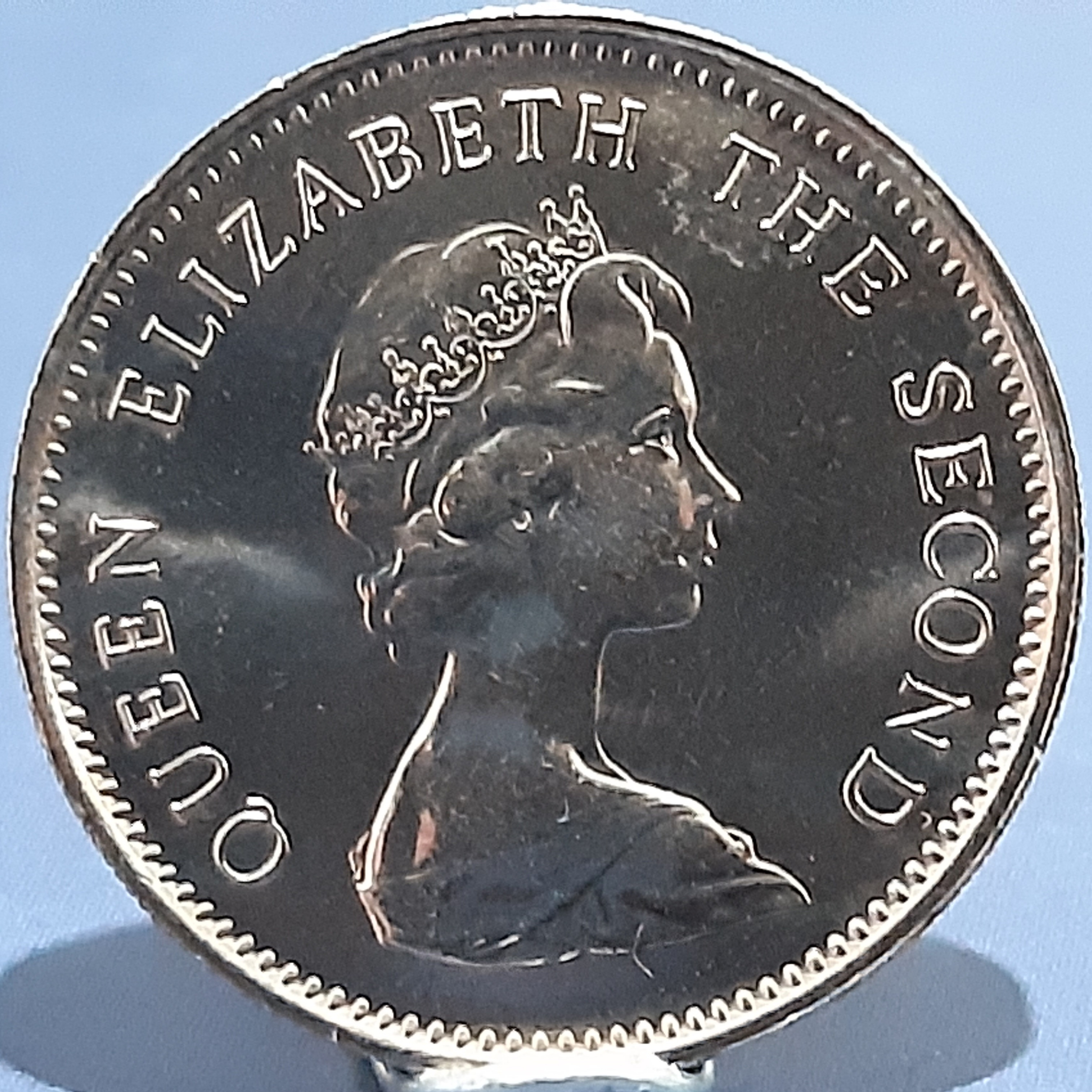
Queen Elizabeth II of Tuvalu on the obverse of a 1985 Tuvaluan 10-cent coin

Tuvalu is one of 15 independent nations, known as Commonwealth realms, which shares its sovereign with other monarchies in the Commonwealth of Nations, with the monarch's relationship with Tuvalu completely independent from his position as monarch of any other realm; despite sharing the same person as their respective monarch, each of the Commonwealth realms, including Tuvalu, is sovereign and independent of the others. The Tuvaluan monarch is represented in the country by a viceroy, the governor-general of Tuvalu.

Since Tuvaluan independence in 1978, the pan-national Crown has had both a shared and a separate character and the sovereign's role as monarch of Tuvalu is distinct to his or her position as monarch of any other realm, including the United Kingdom. The monarchy thus ceased to be an exclusively British institution and in Tuvalu became a Tuvaluan, or "domesticated" establishment.

This division is illustrated in a number of ways: The sovereign, for example, holds a unique Tuvaluan title and, when he is acting in public specifically as a representative of Tuvalu, uses, where possible, Tuvaluan symbols, including the country's national flag, unique royal symbols, and the like. Also, only Tuvaluan government ministers can advise the sovereign on matters of the country.

Tuvalu and the peoples of these islands hold a very special place in the Queen's heart. Her Majesty well remembers the warmth of the traditional Tuvaluan welcome she and the Duke of Edinburgh received on the occasion of her last visit to her people in 1982. Indeed the whole world remembers the reception you gave Her Majesty back then it is one of the iconic images of her reign.

— Prince William, Duke of Cambridge, 2012

In Tuvalu, the legal personality of the state is referred to as the Crown in Right of Tuvalu.

=== Title ===
The Royal Style and Title Act 1987, passed by the Tuvaluan Parliament, granted separate style and titles to Queen Elizabeth II for use in relation to Tuvalu. Thereafter, the Queen's official Tuvaluan style and titles became: Elizabeth the Second, by the Grace of God Queen of Tuvalu and of Her other Realms and Territories, Head of the Commonwealth. Since the accession of King Charles III, the monarch's title is: Charles the Third, by the Grace of God King of Tuvalu and of His other Realms and Territories, Head of the Commonwealth.

This style communicates Tuvalu's status as an independent monarchy, highlighting the monarch's role specifically as sovereign of Tuvalu, as well as the shared aspect of the Crown throughout the Commonwealth. Typically, the sovereign is styled "King of Tuvalu", and is addressed as such when in Tuvalu, or performing duties on behalf of Tuvalu abroad.

=== Succession ===
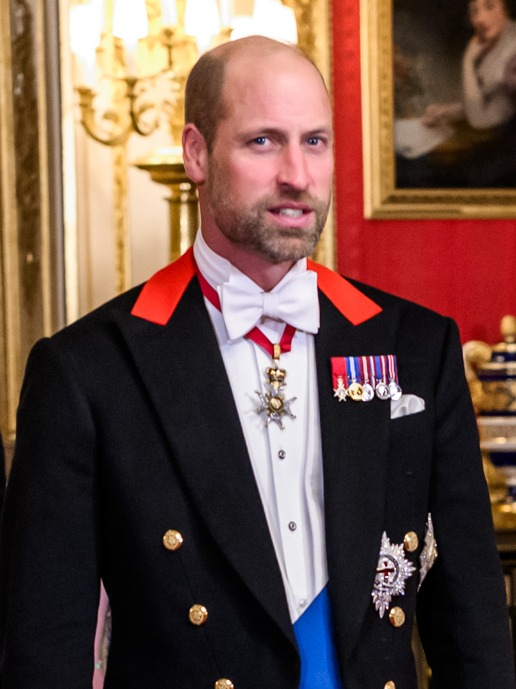
William, Prince of Wales, is the current heir apparent to the Tuvaluan throne

Succession is by absolute primogeniture, governed by the provisions of the Succession to the Crown Act 2013, as well as the Act of Settlement, 1701 and the Bill of Rights, 1689. This legislation limits the succession to the natural (i.e. non-adopted), legitimate descendants of Sophia, Electress of Hanover, and stipulates that the monarch cannot be a Roman Catholic and must be in communion with the Church of England upon ascending the throne. Though these constitutional laws, as they apply to Tuvalu, still lie within the control of the British Parliament, both the United Kingdom and Tuvalu cannot change the rules of succession without the unanimous consent of the other realms, unless explicitly leaving the shared monarchy relationship; a situation that applies identically in all the other realms and which has been likened to a treaty amongst these countries.

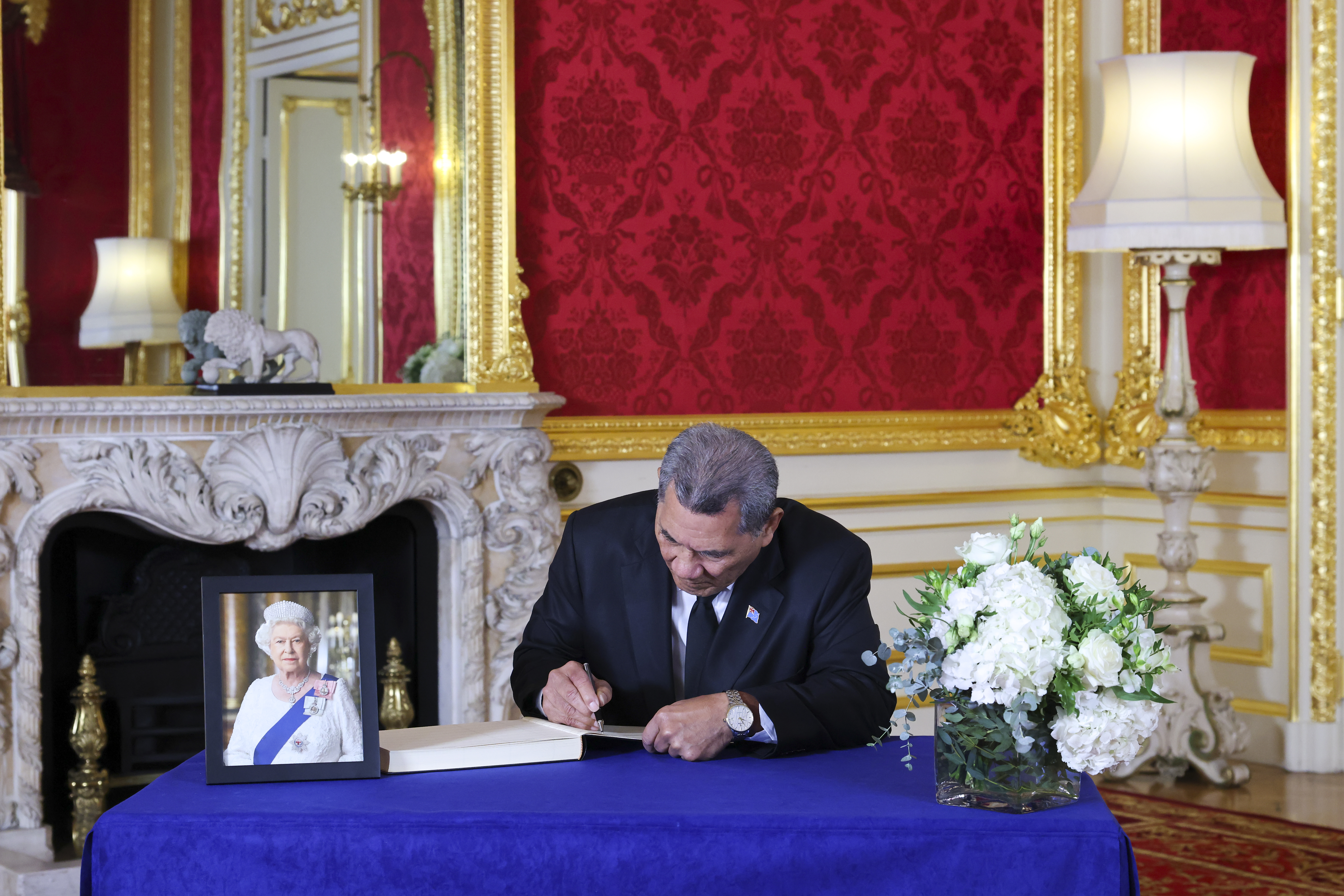
Prime Minister Kausea Natano signing the book of condolences in memory of Queen Elizabeth II at Lancaster House, 17 September 2022

Upon a demise of the Crown (the death or abdication of a sovereign), it is customary for the accession of the new monarch to be publicly proclaimed by the governor-general in the capital, Funafuti, after the accession. Regardless of any proclamations, the late sovereign's heir immediately and automatically succeeds, without any need for confirmation or further ceremony. An appropriate period of mourning also follows, during which flags across the country are flown at half-mast to honour the late monarch. A state memorial service is likely to be held to commemorate the late monarch.

== Personification of the state ==
I, (name), do swear (or solemnly affirm) that I will be faithful and bear true allegiance to the Sovereign of Tuvalu. (So help me God)

— Oath of Allegiance in Tuvalu

Section 51 of the Constitution of Tuvalu, which states that the head of state is recognised as a symbol of the unity and identity of Tuvalu. The functions of the head of state are set out in sections 52 and 53 of the Constitution.

The sovereign is the locus of oaths of allegiance, required of many employees of the Crown, as well as by new citizens, as per the Citizenship Act. This is done in reciprocation to the sovereign's Coronation Oath, wherein they promise to govern the peoples of their realms, "according to their respective laws and customs".

== Constitutional role and royal prerogative ==
The flag of the Tuvaluan governor-general featuring St Edward's Crown

The constitution of Tuvalu gives the country a parliamentary system of government under a constitutional monarchy, wherein the role of the monarch and governor-general is both legal and practical, but not political. The Crown is regarded as a corporation, in which several parts share the authority of the whole, with the sovereign as the person at the centre of the constitutional construct, meaning all powers of state are constitutionally reposed in the sovereign. The government of Tuvalu is also thus formally referred to as His Majesty's Government.

Most of the monarch's domestic duties are performed by the governor-general, appointed by the monarch on the advice of the prime minister of Tuvalu.

=== Executive ===
Part V, section 62 of the Constitution of Tuvalu describes the vesting of the executive authority:

(1) The executive authority of Tuvalu is primarily vested in the Sovereign, and the Governor-General as the representative of the Sovereign.
(2) The executive authority so vested in the Sovereign shall be exercised in accordance with section 53 (performance of functions by the Head of State).

The prime minister, who heads the Cabinet of Tuvalu, is responsible for advising the monarch or governor-general on how to execute their executive powers over all aspects of government operations and foreign affairs. The monarch's, and thereby the viceroy's, role is almost entirely symbolic and cultural, acting as a symbol of the legal authority under which all governments and agencies operate, while the Cabinet directs the use of the royal prerogative, which includes the privilege to declare war and maintain the King's peace, as well as to summon and prorogue parliament and call elections. However, the royal prerogative belongs to the Crown and not to any of the ministers; though, it might have sometimes appeared that way, and the constitution allows the governor-general to unilaterally use these powers in relation to the dismissal of a prime minister, dissolution of parliament, and removal of a judge in exceptional, constitutional crisis situations. There are also a few duties which are specifically performed by the monarch, such as appointing the governor-general.

The prime minister is elected by the Parliament of Tuvalu in accordance with section 64 of the constitution, with the governor-general calling a meeting of parliament to elect a new prime minister after each general election and in the event of a vacancy. The governor-general appoints a Cabinet at the direction of the prime minister. The monarch is informed by his viceroy of the acceptance of the resignation of a prime minister and the swearing-in of a new prime minister and other members of the ministry, and he remains fully briefed through regular communications from his Tuvaluan ministers. Members of various executive agencies and other officials, such as High Court justices, are also appointed by the Crown.

=== Foreign affairs ===
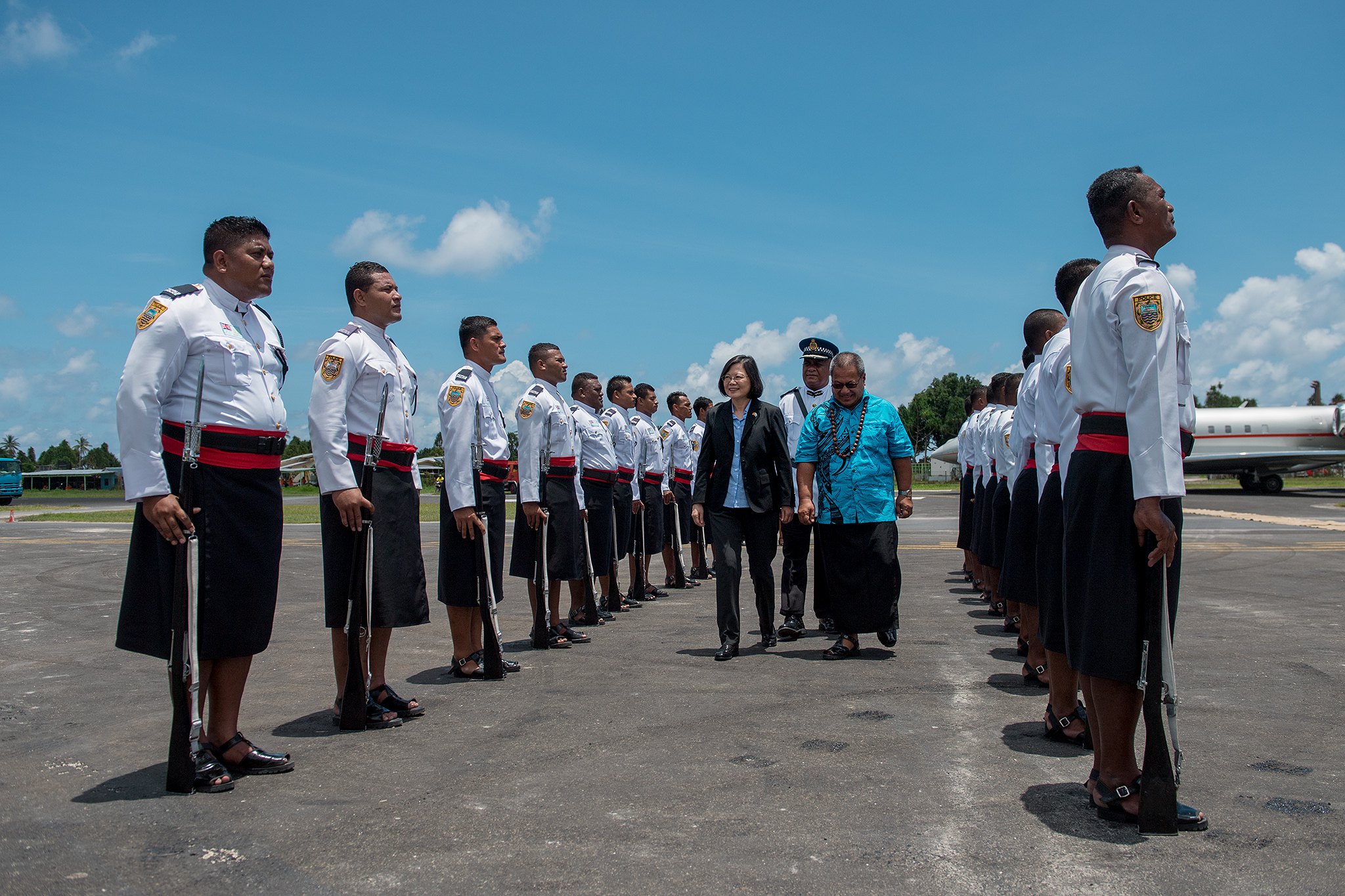
Governor-General Iakoba Italeli with President Tsai Ing-wen of Taiwan, 2017

The royal prerogative further extends to foreign affairs: the governor-general ratifies treaties, alliances, and international agreements. As with other uses of the royal prerogative, no parliamentary approval is required. However, a treaty cannot alter the domestic laws of Tuvalu; an act of Parliament is necessary in such cases. The governor-general, on behalf of the monarch, also accredits Tuvaluan high commissioners and ambassadors and receives diplomats from foreign states. In addition, the issuance of passports falls under the royal prerogative and, as such, all Tuvaluan passports are issued in the name of the monarch. The first page of a Tuvaluan passport reads:

"The Governor-General of Tuvalu hereby requests and requires in the name of the Sovereign of Tuvalu all those whom it may concern to allow the holder of this passport to pass freely, without hindrance or delay, and in case of need to give the holder all lawful aid and protection."

=== Parliament ===
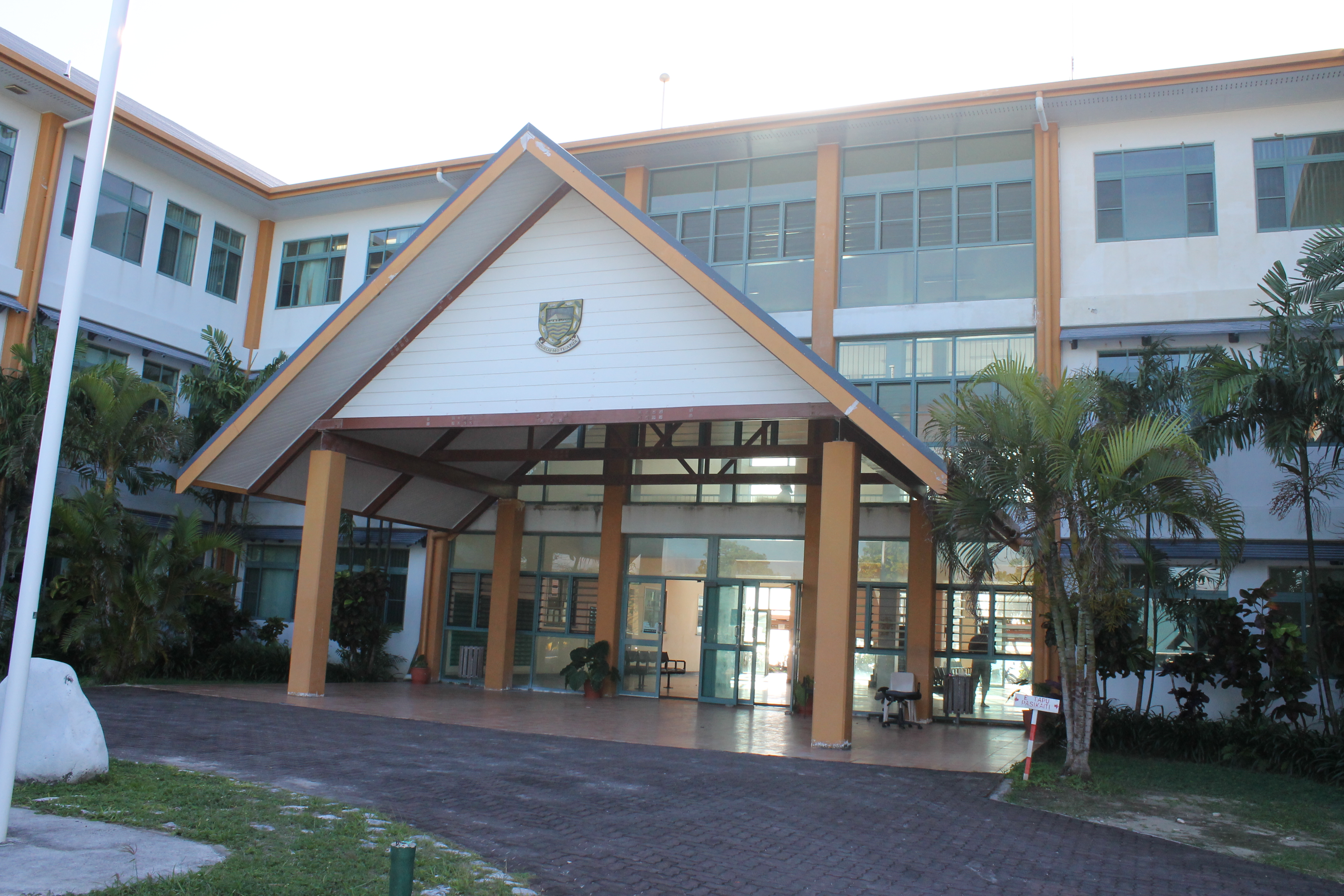
Parliament of Tuvalu

The governor-general is responsible for summoning the Parliament of Tuvalu, acting on the advice of cabinet. If the parliament does not meet at least twice within the year or within three months after a general election, the governor-general may recall parliament at the request of the speaker or a majority of its members. The opening of a new parliamentary session is marked by the Speech from the Governor-General, which outlines the government's legislative agenda.

The governor-general is also responsible for the prorogation of parliament, acting upon a resolution of parliament. Parliament is automatically dissolved four years after the first sitting of parliament after a general election. The governor-general may dissolve parliament at an earlier point if parliament so resolves, or otherwise "acting in his own deliberate judgment" if the office of prime minister is vacant and no successor has been elected within a reasonable period. A general election follows dissolution, the writs for a general election are usually dropped by the governor-general at Government House, Funafuti.

As all executive authority is vested in the sovereign, royal assent is required to allow for bills to become acts of parliament. Section 88 of the constitution requires the governor-general to "promptly assent" to the bill; there is no discretion to refuse assent.

=== Courts ===
All justices of the High Court of Tuvalu are appointed by the governor-general. The highest court of appeal for Tuvalu is the Judicial Committee of the King's Privy Council.

In Tuvalu, criminal offences are legally deemed to be offences against the sovereign and proceedings for indictable offences are brought in the sovereign's name in the form of Rex [or Regina] versus [Name] (rex/regina being Latin for king/queen). Hence, common law holds that the sovereign "can do no wrong"; the monarch cannot be prosecuted in his or her own courts for criminal offences.

The sovereign, and by extension the governor-general, can also grant immunity from prosecution, exercise the royal prerogative of mercy, and pardon offences against the Crown, either before, during, or after a trial. The exercise of the power of mercy to grant a pardon and the commutation of prison sentences is described in section 82 of the constitution.

== Cultural role ==
The Queen's 90th birthday parade in Tuvalu, 2016

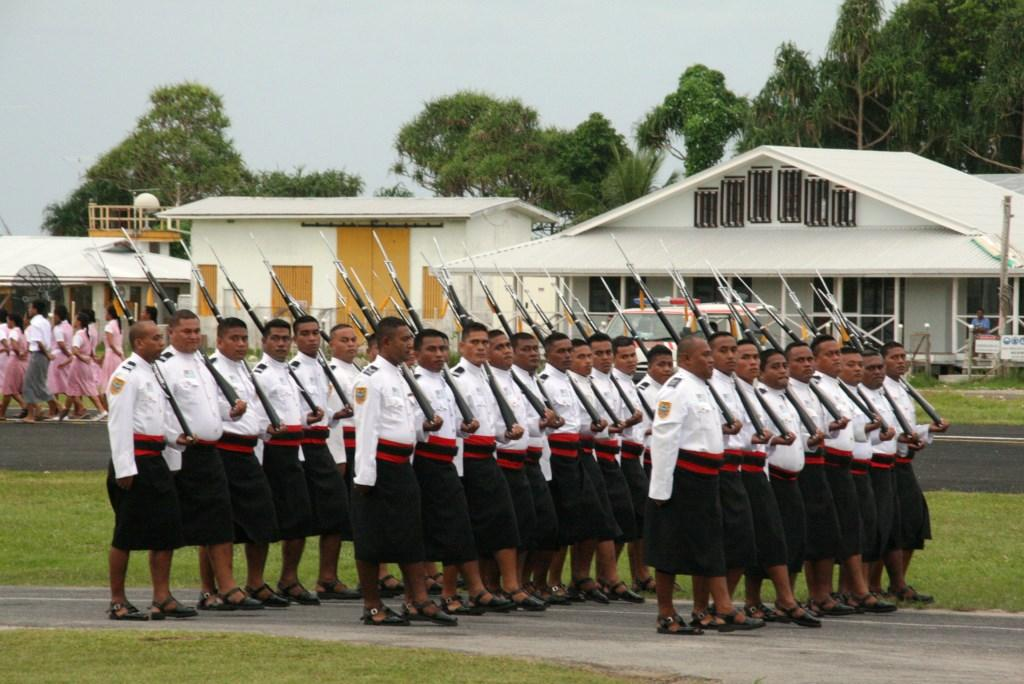

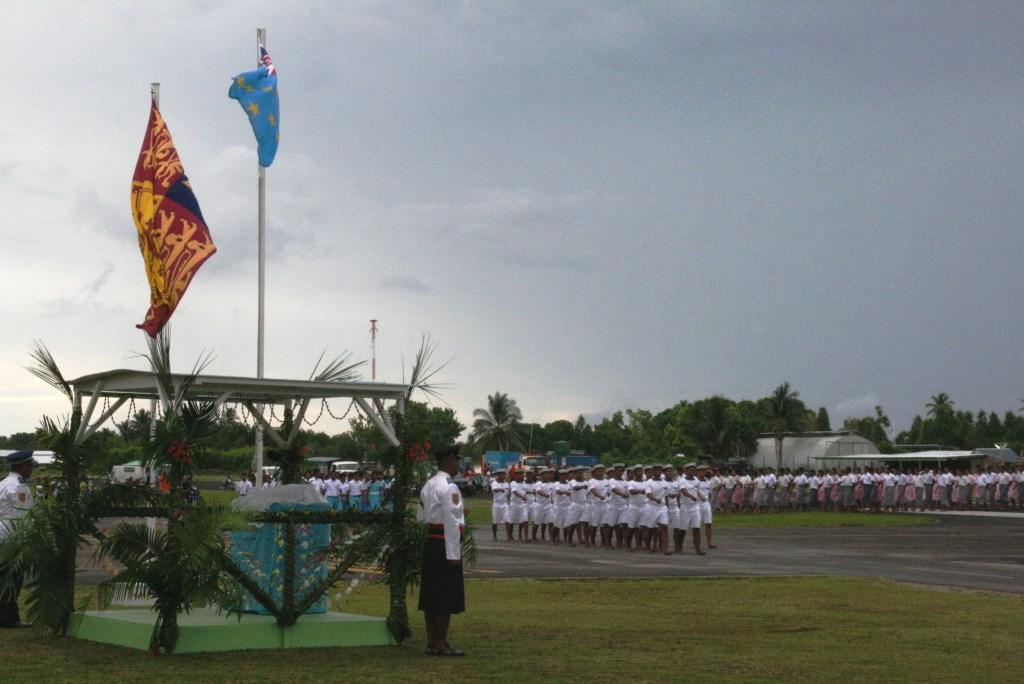

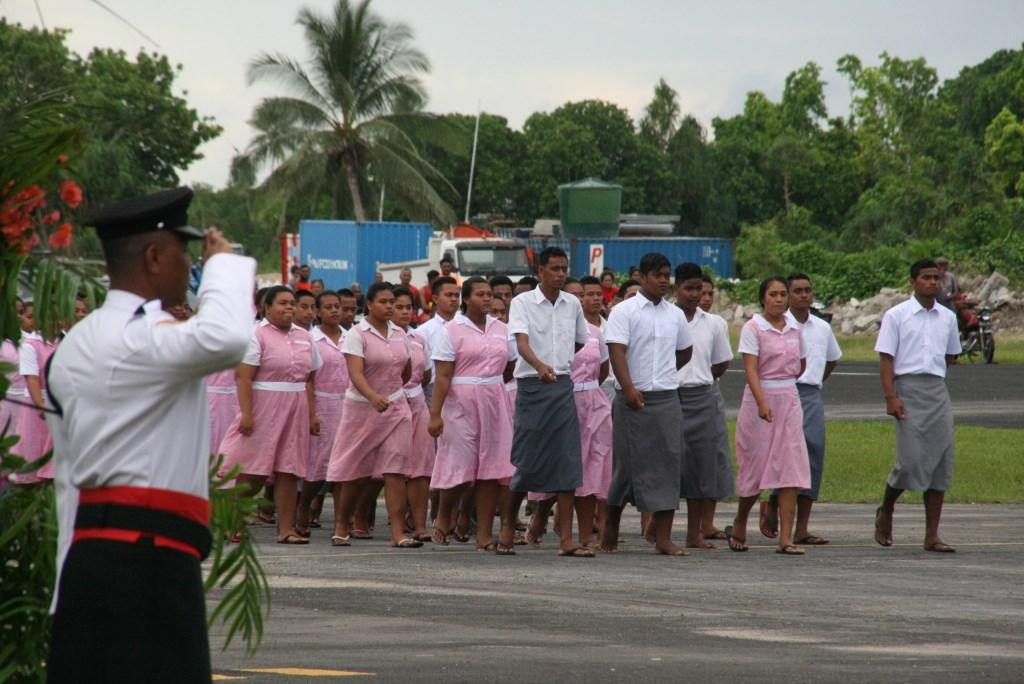

The King's Official Birthday is a public holiday in Tuvalu. It is usually celebrated on the second Saturday of June every year. Tuvaluans celebrate it with church services and prayers, singing God Save The King and Tuvalu mo te Atua, flag hoisting, public speeches, a royal salute, and a parade. As the King's Birthday is a public holiday, all government offices, educational institutions, and most businesses are closed for the day.

Tuvaluans also celebrated the birthday of the former Prince of Wales (now King Charles III). Heir to the Throne Day was a public holiday in November.

=== The Crown and Honours ===
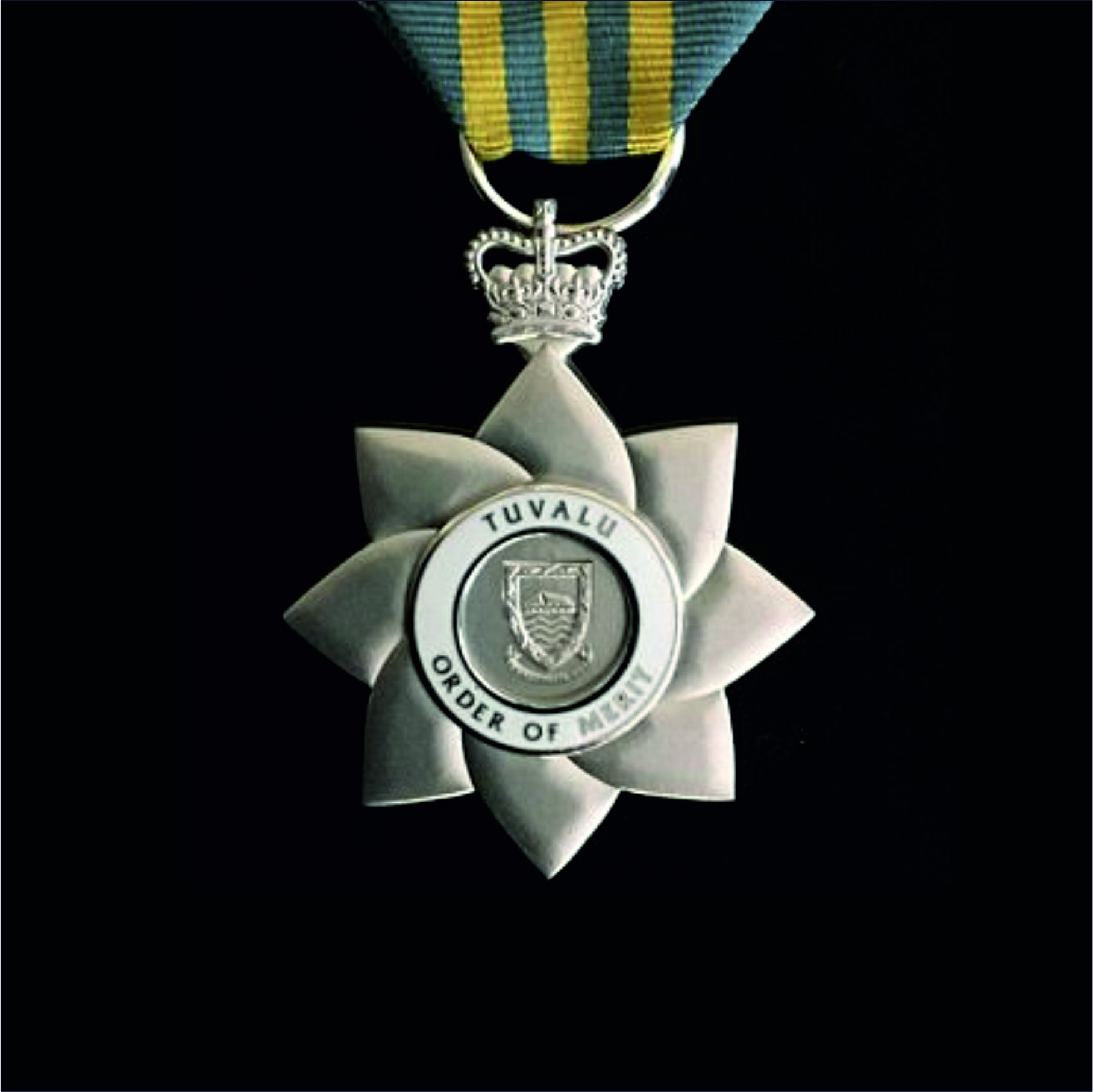
The insignia of the Tuvalu Order of Merit with St Edward's Crown

Within the Commonwealth realms, the monarch is deemed the fount of honour. Similarly, the monarch, as Sovereign of Tuvalu, confers awards and honours in Tuvalu in his name. Most of them are often awarded on the advice of "His Majesty's Tuvalu Ministers".

Investitures are conducted by the governor-general on behalf of the sovereign.

=== The Crown and the Police Force ===
The emblem of the Tuvalu Police Force featuring St Edward's Crown

The Tuvalu Police Force's patrol vessels bear the prefix HMTSS (His Majesty's Tuvalu Surveillance Ship). A St. Edward's Crown appears on the police force's badges and rank insignia, which illustrates the monarchy as the locus of authority.

Under Section 163(5) of the Constitution, the Commissioner of Police is appointed by the Head of State, acting in accordance with the advice of the Cabinet given after consultation with the Public Service Commission. Under the Police Act of Tuvalu, every member of the Tuvalu Police Force must, upon being enrolled, swear allegiance to the monarch of Tuvalu. The current oath is:

"I, [name], do swear by Almighty God (or solemnly and sincerely affirm) that I will well and truly that I will be faithful and bear true allegiance to His Majesty King Charles the Third, His Heirs and Successors, and that I will faithfully serve His Majesty the King, His Heirs and Successors, during my service in the Tuvalu Police Force: that I will subject myself to all Acts, orders and regulations relating to the said Police now in force or which may from time to time be in force and will discharge all the duties of a police officer according to law, without fear or favour, affection or ill-will."

=== Royal visits ===
Prince Philip, Duke of Edinburgh, was the first member of the royal family to visit the islands in 1959. Prince Charles, Prince of Wales, visited in October 1970, following his attendance at the Fiji independence celebrations.

Princess Margaret arrived in September 1978 to represent the Queen at the independence celebrations, but her visit was cut short by illness.

Elizabeth II, Queen of Tuvalu, and the Duke of Edinburgh toured Tuvalu between 26 and 27 October 1982. The royal couple were carried around in ceremonial litters and later served with traditional local dishes on a banquet. They also installed the corner-stone of a future Parliament building. A sheet of commemorative stamps was issued for the royal visit by the Tuvalu Philatelic Bureau.

I have heard a great deal about Tuvalu from my family and I am only sorry I cannot visit other islands, but I understand all of them are represented here today. I am very glad that my first visit to your country should be as Queen of Tuvalu. I come also to you as Head of the Commonwealth.

— Elizabeth II of Tuvalu, 1982

In 2012, the Duke and Duchess of Cambridge visited Tuvalu to mark the Queen's Diamond Jubilee. They toured a number of places. Dressed in colourful grass skirts, they also took part in the traditional dancing.

== Republic debate ==
In the first years of the 21st century there was a debate about the abolition of the monarchy. Prime Minister Saufatu Sopoanga had stated in 2004 that he was in favour of replacing the Queen as Tuvalu's head of state, a view supported by former Prime Ministers Ionatana Ionatana and Kamuta Latasi. Sopoanga stated that public opinion would be evaluated first before taking any further moves and a referendum was held in 2008. The monarchy was retained, with 1,260 votes to 679 (64.98%).

=== Opinion polls ===
An opinion poll conducted in 2023 found 71% in favour of retaining the monarchy, while 26% preferred that Tuvalu became a republic.

== List of Tuvaluan monarchs ==
| Portrait | Regnal name (Birth–Death) | Reign over Tuvalu | | Full name | Consort | House |
| Portrait | Regnal name (Birth–Death) | Start | End | Full name | Consort | House |
|---|---|---|---|---|---|---|
| | Elizabeth II (1926–2022) | 1 October 1978 | 8 September 2022 | Elizabeth Alexandra Mary | Philip Mountbatten | Windsor |
| | Elizabeth II (1926–2022) | Governors-general: Sir Fiatau Penitala Teo, Sir Tupua Leupena, Sir Toaripi Lauti, Sir Tomu Sione, Sir Tulaga Manuella, Sir Tomasi Puapua, Faimalaga Luka, Sir Filoimea Telito, Sir Iakoba Italeli, Sir Tofiga Vaevalu Falani; Prime ministers: Toaripi Lauti, Tomasi Puapua, Bikenibeu Paeniu, Kamuta Latasi, Ionatana Ionatana, Faimalaga Luka, Koloa Talake, Saufatu Sopoanga, Maatia Toafa, Apisai Ielemia, Willy Telavi, Enele Sopoaga, Kausea Natano | | | | |
| | Charles III (b. 1948) | 8 September 2022 | present | Charles Philip Arthur George | Queen Camilla | Windsor |
| | Charles III (b. 1948) | Governors-general: Sir Tofiga Vaevalu Falani, Temukisa Auina Penehuro Hauma; Prime ministers: Kausea Natano, Feleti Teo | | | | |

== See also ==
- Lists of office-holders
- List of prime ministers of Elizabeth II
- List of prime ministers of Charles III
- List of Commonwealth visits made by Elizabeth II
- Monarchies in Oceania
- List of monarchies
