= Tofiga Vaevalu Falani =

Governor-General of Tuvalu from 2021 to 2026

The Reverend Sir Tofiga Vaevalu Falani GCMG MBE
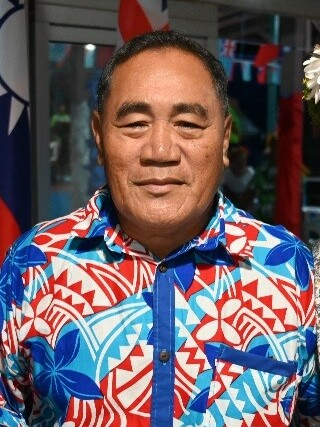
- Falani in 2021

10th Governor-General of Tuvalu
- In office 29 September 2021 – 27 September 2026
- Monarchs: Elizabeth II; Charles III
- Prime Minister: Kausea Natano; Feleti Teo
- Preceded by: Samuelu Teo (acting)
- Succeeded by: Temukisa Auina Penehuro Hauma

Chancellor of the University of the South Pacific
- Incumbent
- Assumed office 1 July 2026
- Preceded by: Tupou VI

Personal details
- Spouse: Lady Tangira Falani

Sir Tofiga Vaevalu Falani is a Tuvaluan religious minister who served as Governor-General of Tuvalu from 2021 to 2026 and as president of the Church of Tuvalu since 2008. In his capacity as church president, he has represented the church at meetings of the Central Committee of the World Council of Churches in 2009 and 2011.

== Governor-General of Tuvalu ==
Before becoming Governor-General, Falani was ordained as a minister in the Church of Tuvalu. He was elevated to become the Church's president in 2008. Falani previously served as the acting governor-general from 14 August 2017 during the absence of Sir Iakoba Italeli.

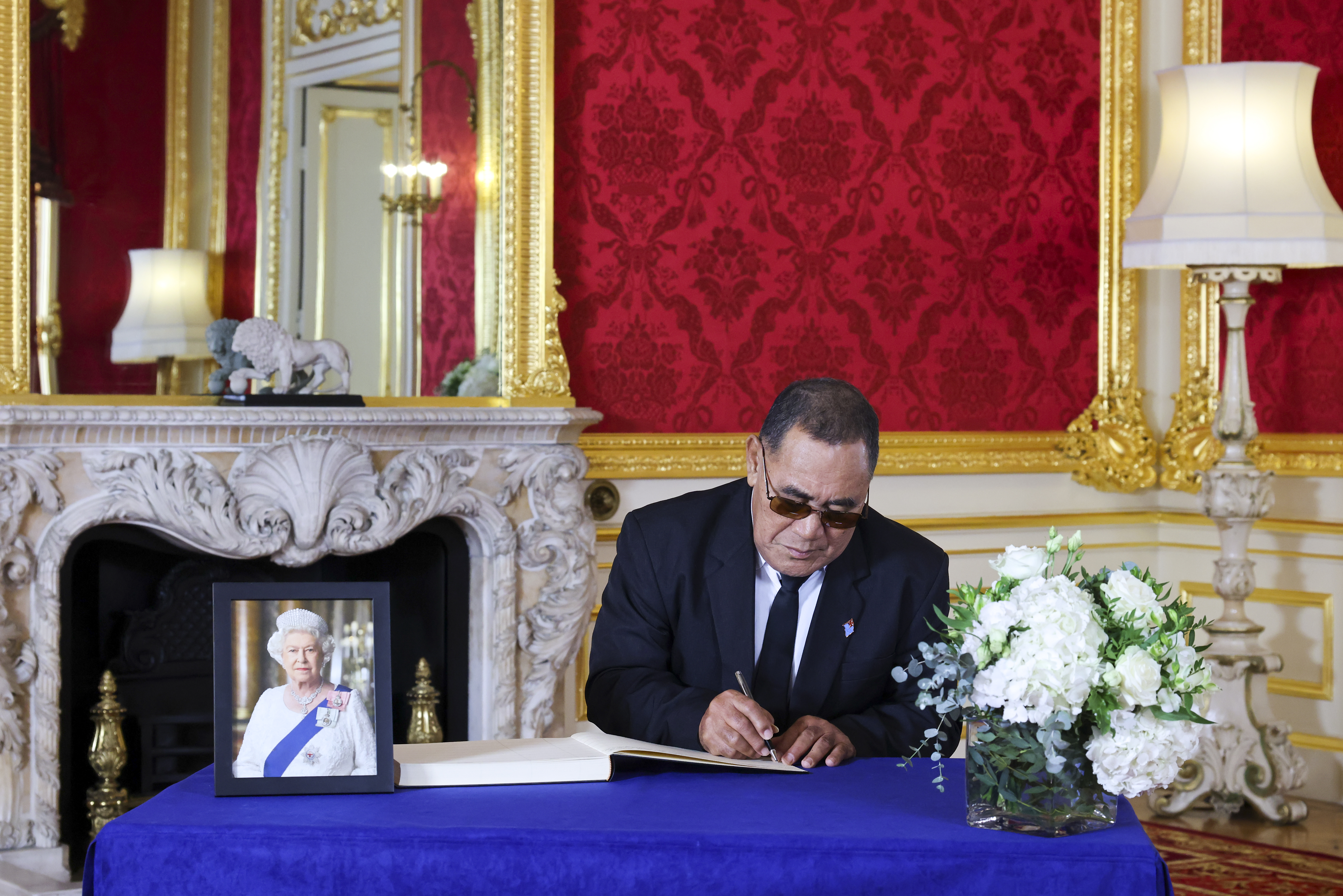
Falani signing the book of condolence for Queen Elizabeth II at Lancaster House on 17 September 2022

In September 2021, Falani was appointed Governor-General of Tuvalu by Queen Elizabeth II, the Queen of Tuvalu. As governor-general, Falani represents the reigning monarch of Tuvalu in the country, acting as viceroy for Tuvalu. His term was due to expire in September 2025, but was extended for 12 months. On 30 September 2026, Falai stepped down as Governor-General and handed over to Temukisa Auina Penehuro Hauma, Tuvalu's first ever female Governor-General.

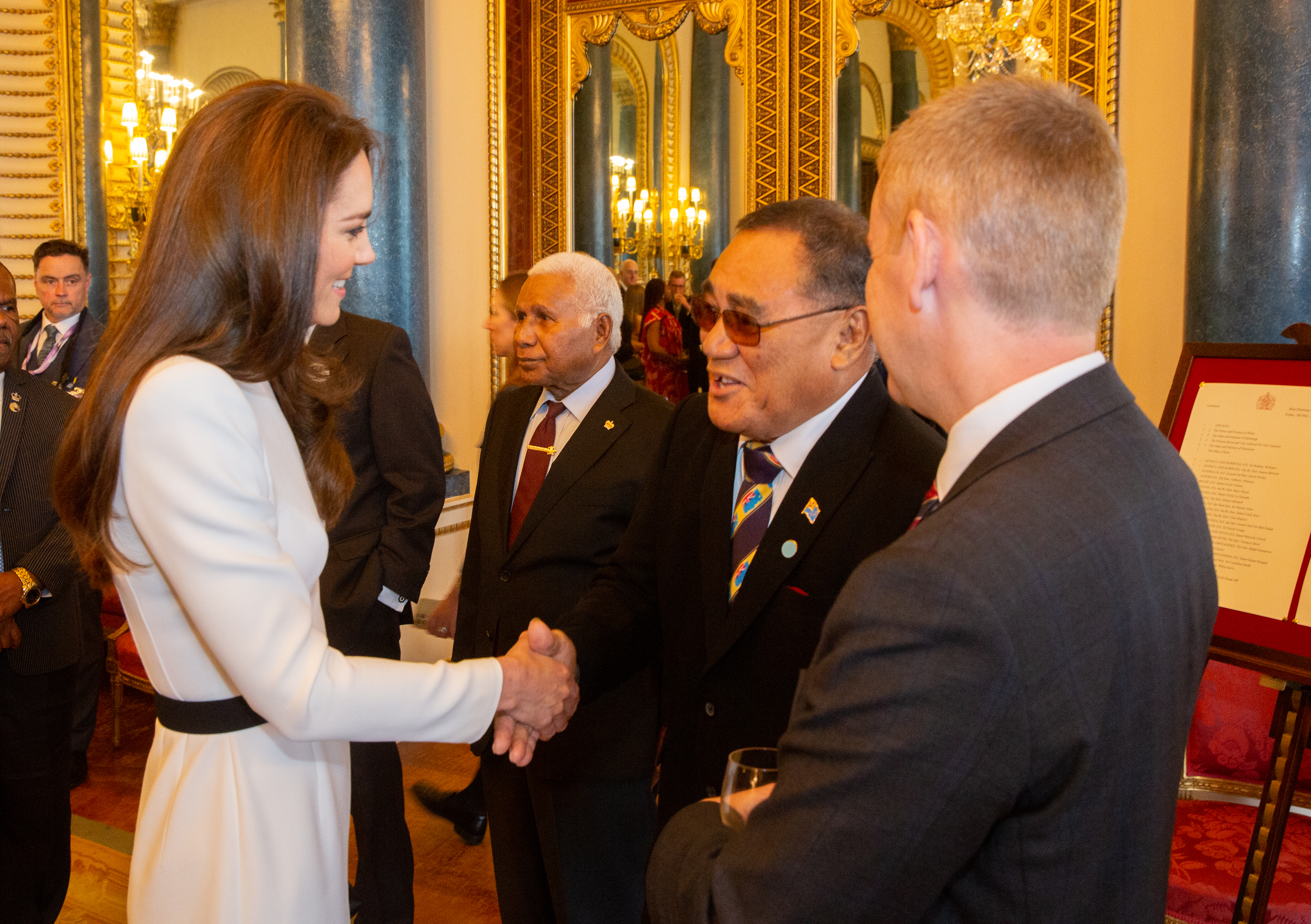
Falani meeting the Princess of Wales at Buckingham Palace, 5 May 2023

== Honours ==
Viceregal styles of Sir Tofiga Vaevalu Falani
- Reference style: His Excellency
- Spoken style: Your Excellency

Falani was appointed Member of the Order of the British Empire (MBE) for public and community service in the 2014 New Year Honours.

On 18 September 2022, Falani was appointed by King Charles III as Knight Grand Cross of the Order of St Michael and St George (GCMG) in the 2022 Special Honours. As he is a clergyman, in accordance with tradition he did not receive the accolade (that is, be dubbed with a sword) as this is considered inappropriate. Instead the King handed him the insignia personally.

Government offices
Preceded by Samuelu Teo; Acting	Governor General of Tuvalu; 2021–2026	Succeeded by Temukisa Auina Penehuro Hauma
