= Women in Oceania =

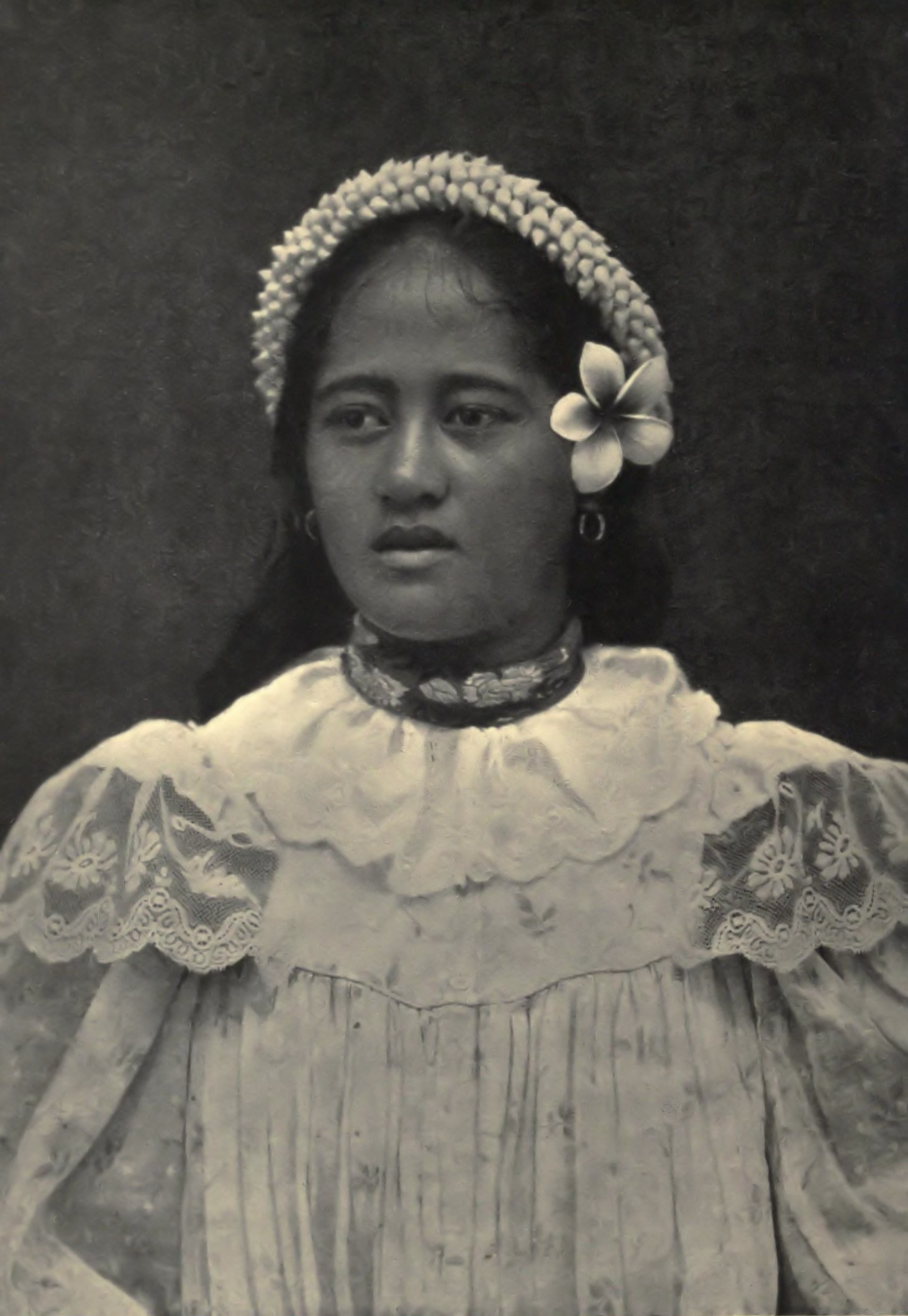
A woman from Tahiti, French Polynesia, circa 1906.

Women have been a vital part of history and culture in the geographic area known today as Oceania. Women in Oceania have diverse cultural identities which relate to the geography of the continent and the social structures of the people living there. Their evolution, culture and history coincide with the history of Oceania itself.

== History ==
=== Early women in Oceania ===
Women in New Zealand are the women who live in or are from the multi-cultural society of New Zealand. The first female settlers in New Zealand were not from Europe. They were from the Māori people.

=== Colonization ===
The person credited to be the first white-skinned European woman to settle in New Zealand was Charlotte Badger (she later had a daughter known as Catherine). The first known Australian settlers arrived on the Cocos islands in 1826.

== Traditional roles among women in Oceania ==
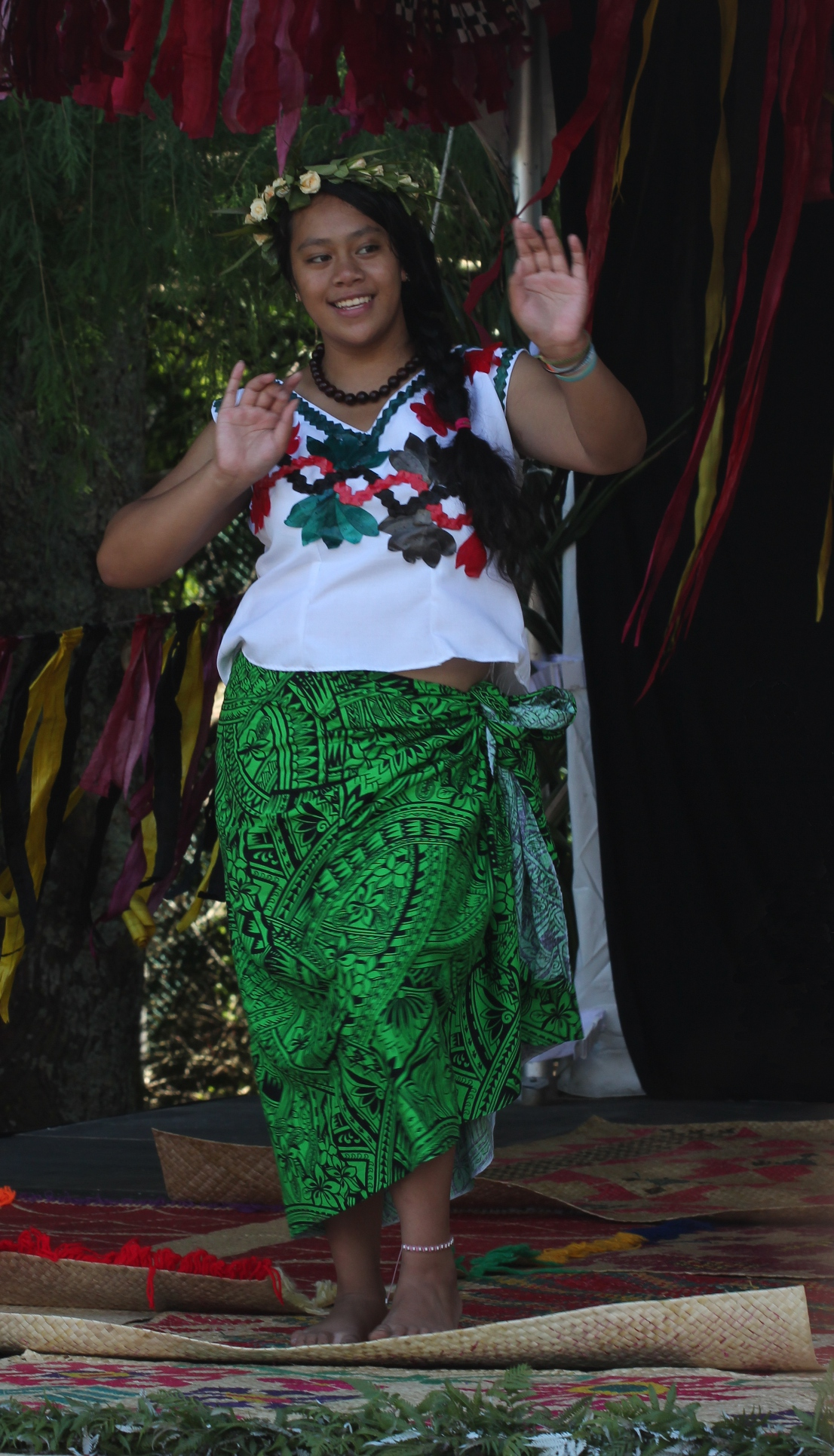
A Tuvaluan dancer at Auckland's Pasifika Festival

The role of Kiribati women is described in the publication Kiribati, A Situation Analysis of Children, Women and Youth (2005) as "largely defined by her age and marital status". Prestige is inherent to the married Kiribati woman, but she is considerably under the authority of her husband.

Historically, there was a strong "gendered division of labor" between women and men of Palau.

Tongan society who traditionally have a "high position in Tongan society" due to the country's partly matriarchal foundation but "can't own land", "subservient" to husbands in terms of "domestic affairs" and "by custom and law, must dress modestly, usually in Mother Hubbard-style dresses hemmed well below the knee".

Women participate in the traditional music of Tuvalu which consists of a number of dances, including the fatele and the fakanau.

== Promoting equality for women in Oceania ==
At present, the women of Indonesia are also venturing actively into the realm of national development, and working as active members of organizations that focus and act on women's issues and concerns.

The women of New Zealand have the same level of equality with men, and are conferred the same level of respect as well.

In relation to the labor force, based on data in 2006, Vanuatuan female workers comprised 49.6% of the workforce of Vanuatu. At present, women in Guam - together with Guamanian men - participate in jobs that belong to the wage economy category; but there are also women - among men - who work in the agricultural sector.

In March 2011, International Women's Day was celebrated on Christmas Island in honor of its female residents. The event was held in order to convey the theme of "what it means to be a woman living on Christmas Island".

Niuean women have "some rights" in relation to land tenure and inheritance of real property, but such rights are not "as strong" as those that belong to the men of Niue.

=== Education ===
Modern-day Fijian women have attained better access to education in recent years.

Tuvaluan women have access to secondary education at Motufoua Secondary School on Vaitupu and Fetuvalu Secondary School, a day school operated by the Church of Tuvalu, on Funafuti.

== Women's health in Oceania ==
In the Solomon Islands, female life expectancy at birth was 66.7 years, compared to male life expectancy at birth at 64.9 in 2007. 1990–1995 fertility rate was at 5.5 births per woman.

== See also ==
=== Sovereign states in Oceania ===
- Women in Australia
- Women and government in Australia
- Women in Fiji
- Women in Indonesia
- Women in Kiribati
- Women in the Marshall Islands
- Women in the Federated States of Micronesia
- Women in New Zealand
- Women's suffrage in New Zealand
- Women in Palau
- Women in Tonga
- Women in Tuvalu
- Women in Vanuatu

=== Dependent territories (Australia) ===
- Women in Christmas Island
- Women in the Cocos (Keeling) Islands

=== Dependent territories (New Zealand) ===
- Women in the Cook Islands
- Women in Niue

=== Dependent territories (USA) ===
- Women in Guam
- Women in Hawaii

=== Related topics ===
- Indigenous peoples of Oceania
