= Art of Tuvalu =

The art of Tuvalu has traditionally been expressed in the design of clothing and traditional handicrafts such as the decoration of mats and fans. Tuvaluan clothing was traditionally made from fala leaves (screw pine or Pandanus).

The material culture of Tuvalu uses traditional design elements in artifacts used in everyday life such as the design of canoes and fish hooks made from traditional materials. The design of women's skirts (titi) and tops (teuga saka), that are used in performances of the traditional dance songs of Tuvalu, represents contemporary Tuvaluan art and design.

The collection of the Museum of New Zealand holds Tuvaluan artifacts and handicraft, including a man's jacket and a Mother Hubbard dress (Note: pandanus jacket (FE001055/1) and Mother Hubbard dress (FE001055/2) Catalogue of the Museum of New Zealand (Te Papa).) made from Pandanus leaves that were made following the impact of Christian missionaries who demanded that the women of Tuvalu adopt more conservative clothing as compared to traditional Tuvaluan clothing.

== Artistry ==
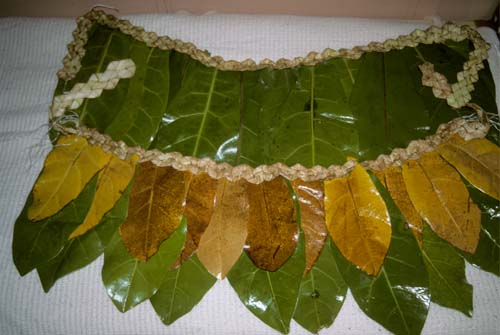
A traditional skirt made of Futu (Barringtonia asiatica) leaves from Nanumea atoll.

The women of Tuvalu use Cypraeidae (cowrie, pule) such as Cypraea mauritiana, C. arabica, C. tigris, C. depressa, C. mapa, C. carneola, C. vitellus, C. lynx and other shells harvested from the reefs in traditional handicrafts which includes creating shell necklaces (tui misa or tui pule) and the decoration of mats, fans and wall hangings. Crochet (kolose) is one of the art forms practiced by Tuvaluan women.

A traditional headband (fau o aliki) or headdress (kula, pale) made out of pandanus, such as those prepared for the inauguration of a chief (aliki) would follow a specific design and the task of creating the headband or headdress is often reserved to a specific person, such as a daughter of the chief. The traditional floral garland of a young woman (Te fou ote tamafine) or a headdress for a woman (fou) would also follow a specific design using tiale (gardenia), pua (guettarda speciosa) and melia (frangipani).

Te titi tao is a traditional skirt placed upon another skirt - a titi kaulama - and tops (teuga saka), headbands, armbands, and wristbands continue to be used in performances of the tradition dance music of Tuvalu, such as the fatele.

The fatele, in its modern form, is performed at community events and to celebrate leaders and other prominent individuals, such as the visit of the Duke and Duchess of Cambridge in September 2012.

Contemporary dancing skirts (titi) and tops (teuga saka) may still incorporate pandanus leaves, as well as synthetic or natural cloth that is decorated with bold geometric motifs and bold colours. Tuvaluan men also participate in performances of the traditional music in the costumes that follow tradition style that are made from pandanus leaves and synthetic or natural cloth that incorporate bold colours. Marriage ceremonies are usually conducted with men and women in traditional costumes.

== Material culture ==
In 1960–1961 Gerd Koch a German anthropologist, visited the atolls of Nanumaga, Nukufetau and Niutao, which resulted in his publication of a book on the material culture of the Ellice Islands, which described, with illustrations, the design of traditional handicrafts and artifacts. Following the change of name to Tuvalu, the English translation by Guy Slatter was published under the title The Material Culture of Tuvalu. Charles Hedley, a naturalist at the Australian Museum, had earlier written the General Account of the Atoll of Funafuti (1896) which described some uses of the native plants and trees on Funafuti.

The churches and community buildings that used for wedding celebrations and community activities (the falekaupule or maneapa) are decorated by the community with the exterior painted with white paint that is known as lase, which is made by burning a large amount of dead coral with firewood. The whitish powder that is the result is mixed with water and painted on the buildings.

== Contemporary art and literature ==
Artists with Tuvaluan ancestry in migrant communities, such as the Tuvaluan community in Auckland, New Zealand, produce work using traditional techniques and media and also using modern materials and contemporary Polynesian graphic designs.

In 2015 an exhibition of the art of Tuvalu was held on Funafuti, with works that addressed climate change through the eyes of artists and the display of Kope ote olaga (possessions of life), which was a display of the various artefacts of Tuvalu culture.

- Lakiloko Keakea was born on Nui, Tuvalu, and now lives in New Zealand. Keakea learnt the practise of 'kolose' (crochet) and began making dresses and 'tiputa' (crochet tops). Keakea became active in Fakapotopotoga Fafine Tuvalu, an art group that taught and promoted the art practices of women from the various islands of Tuvalu. she travelled with the group to the Marshall Islands and learn the techniques of making 'fafetu', a star-shaped woven design. She is a member of Fafine Niutao I Aotearoa – the Tuvalu Women's arts collective.
- Selina Tusitala Marsh, of Samoan, Tuvaluan, English and French descent, is a published poet. She represented Tuvalu at the London Olympics Poetry Parnassus event in 2012.

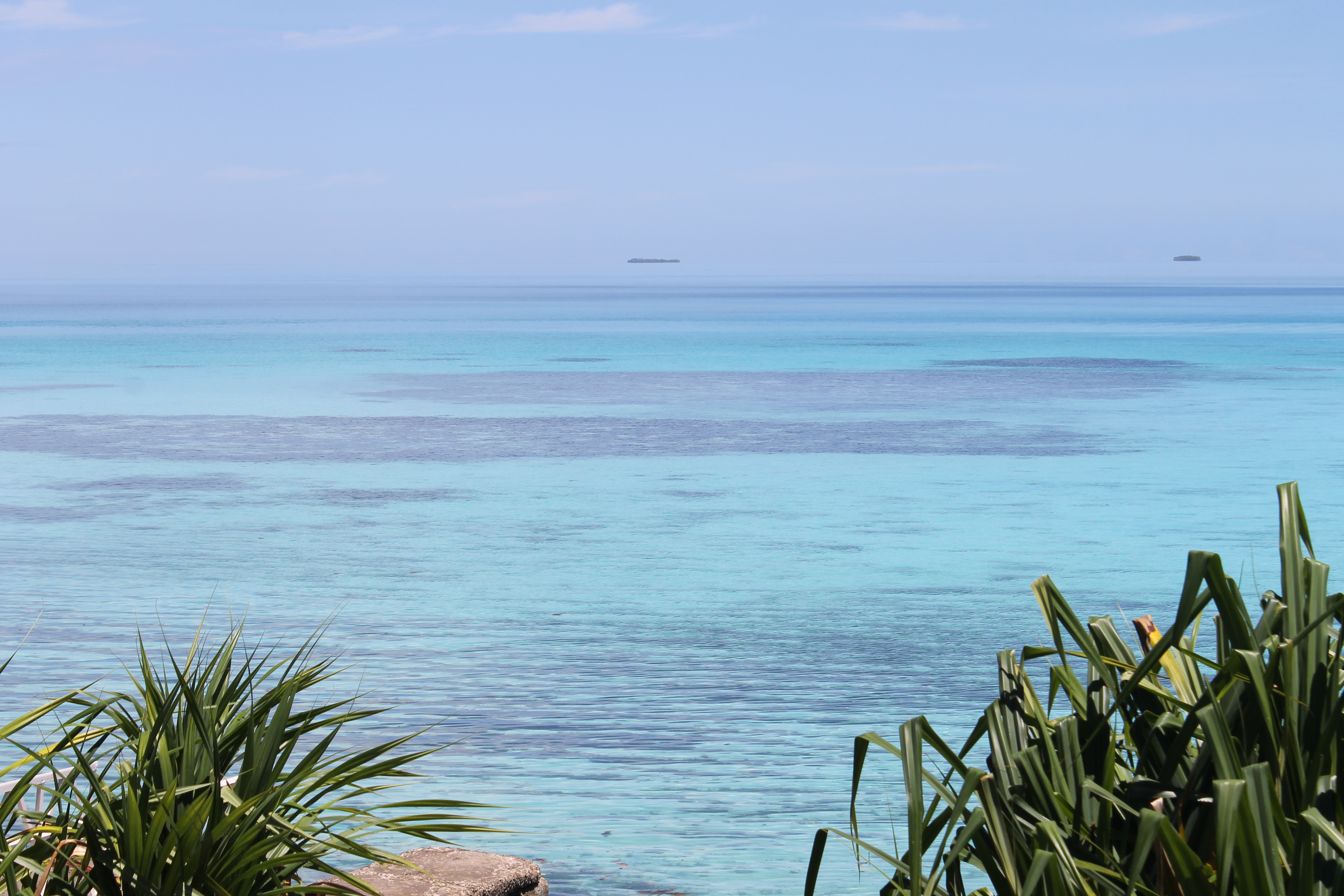
Funafuti lagoon (Te Namo)

== International artists and Tuvalu ==
Vincent Huang, a Taiwanese artist, constructed an installation on the reef of Funafuti in 2010 that was designed to raise awareness of the effect of climate change in Tuvalu. He was invited to create the Tuvalu Pavilion at the 2013 Venice Biennale. In 2014 he had an exhibition at the Museum of Contemporary Art, Taipei that invited visitors to consider the moral threat climate change presents to Tuvalu. Huang was invited to represent Tuvalu at the 2015 Venice Biennale. He created a turquoise pool crossed by two black walkways. The weight of the people on the walkways results in the pathways sinking into the water causing 'flooding' that symbolically reproduces the impact of global warming on Tuvalu. Huang selected the PVC lining of the pool to reproduce the colour of the "beautiful crystal blue of the Tuvalu lagoon".

== See also ==
- Vaiaso ote Gana, Tuvalu Language Week Education Resource 2016 (New Zealand Ministry for Pacific Peoples)
- Lambert, Sylvester M. "Women dancers in Tuvalu". Special Collections & Archives, UC San Diego.

== Notes ==
Footnotes

Citations
