= Women in the Marshall Islands =

President Tsai hosts a dinner banquet in the Marshall Islands

Women in the Marshall Islands are women who live in or are from the Republic of the Marshall Islands, an island country that is politically a presidential republic in free association with the United States. Alternative appellations for these women are Marshallese women, Marshall Islander women, Marshalls women, and women in Rālik-Ratak (literally women "facing toward the windward" [i.e. facing sunrise] and "facing toward the leeward" [i.e. facing sunset]).

== Arts and crafts ==
Marshallese women are known to create "finely-woven pandanus" and art made from coconut fiber.

== Social status ==
The society of the Marshall Islands primarily has a social structure that is matrilineal. This means that women own "a great deal of power" because they predominate in making decisions "behind-the-scenes" even though men are seen as the "public performers".

In the past, Marshall islander women who belong to the upper class were commonly distinguished by wearing "intricate tattoos", and were spoken to using "restricted speech genres" and "speaking styles". At present, modern-day women in the Marshall Islands may wear "American-style dress modified it to local norms" where the emerging elite may wear "costly dress and personal adornment".

== Social welfare ==
There are social welfare programs for women, particularly in urban areas, that had been supported by the United States, by religious groups and by other nations belonging to the Pacific Rim region since the 1960s. The umbrella organisation for women's rights groups is Women United Together Marshall Islands (WUTMI), whose Executive Director was Kathryn Relang. Relang worked on several projects, including: youth empowerment in the workplace; providing support services for survivors of domestic violence; raising awareness about legal rights in domestic violence cases; the importance of women's roles in conservation. However the most important aspect of WUTMI's work is the prevention of gender-based violence, which is widespread in the Marshall Islands.

== See also ==
- Marshallese culture
- Religion in the Marshall Islands
- Economy of the Marshall Islands
- Japanese settlement in the Marshall Islands
- Bikini Atoll
