= Women in the Cook Islands =

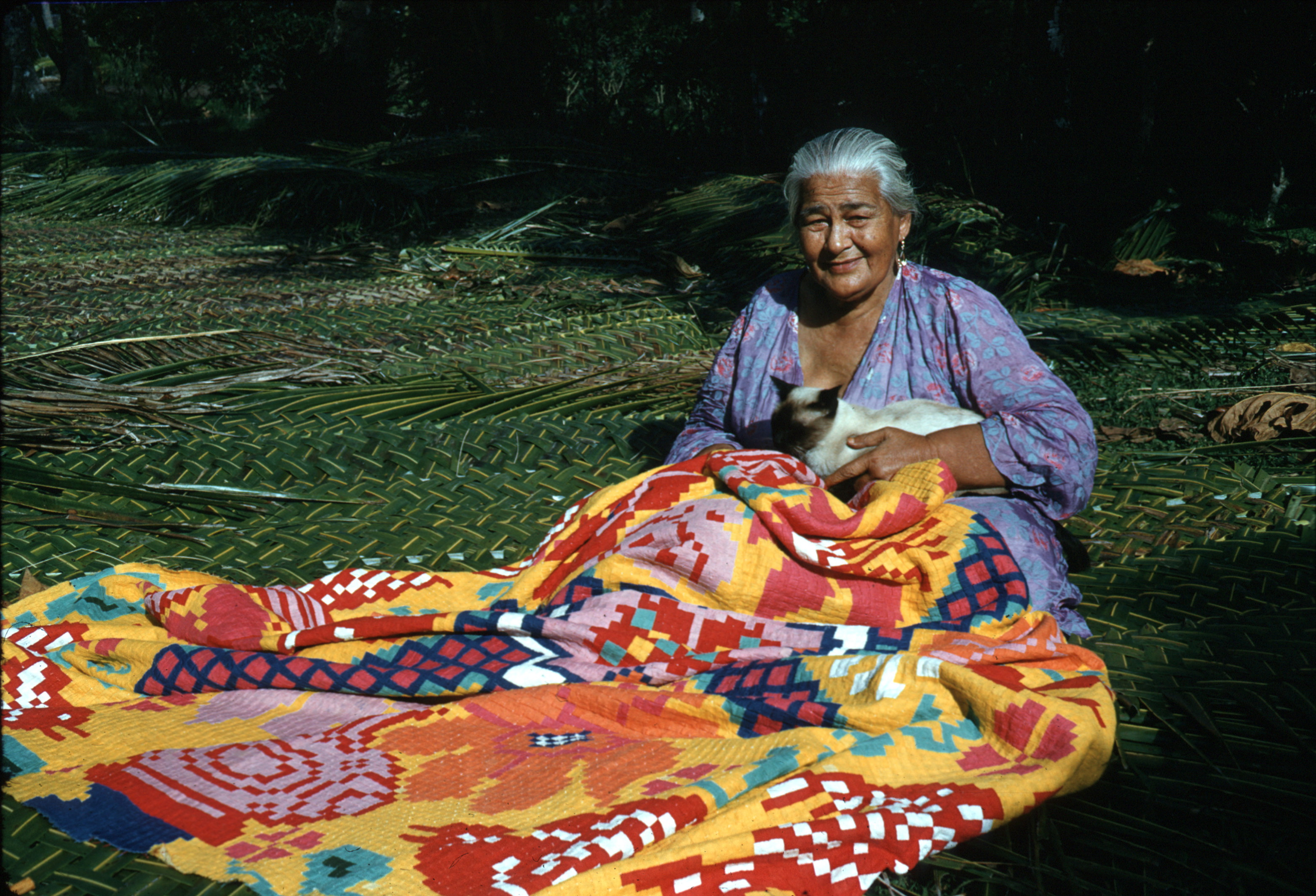
An old woman from the Cook Islands sewing a tivaevae.

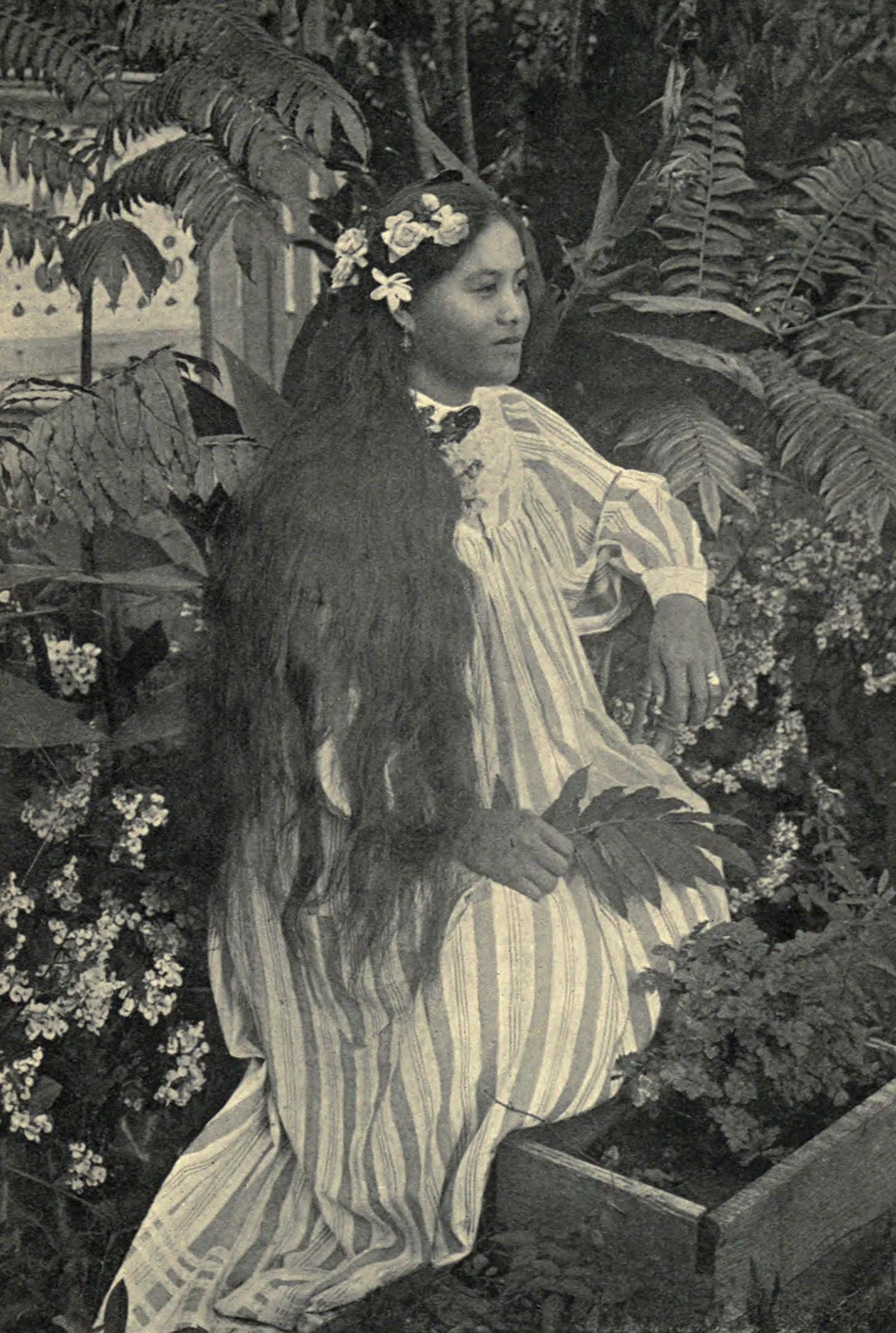
A portrait of a pure-caste Rarotongan girl from the Cook Islands, before 1906.

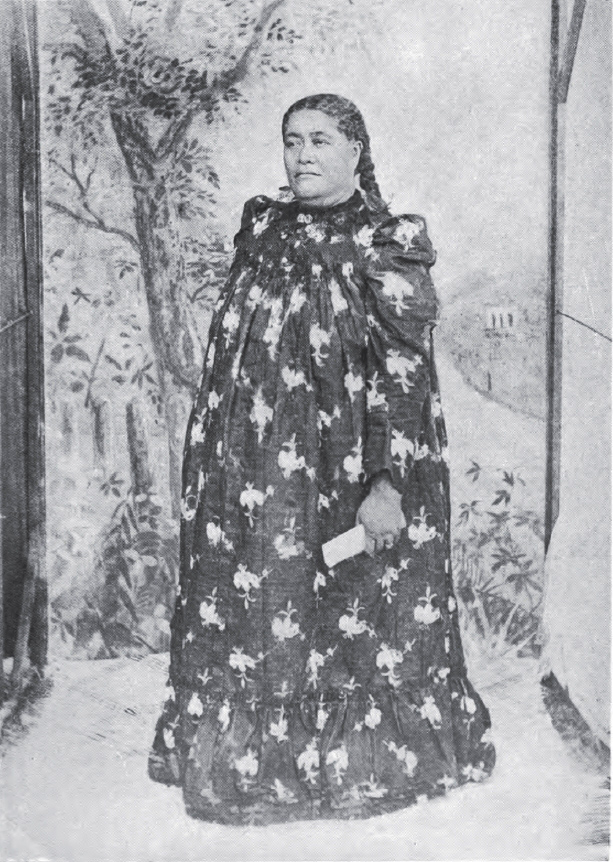
Makea Takau, Queen of Rarotonga, the Cook Islands. This photograph was taken during her trip to Auckland, New Zealand in 1885.

Women in the Cook Islands are women of the Oceanian region who live in or are from the Cook Islands, an island country in the South Pacific Ocean that is in free association with New Zealand.

== Dress ==
Traditional clothing for dancing include wearing of flowers in the hair of women (men also wear flowers in their hair), headbands, collars, and "short, fringed grass skirts".

== Social status and roles ==
In general, women do domestic chores but they also often work outside the confines of the household. By tradition, respect is accorded to women due to their roles as "wives and mothers". As figures of the household, women of the Cook Islands oversee and manage the land, crops, and the financial resources of the family unit. In relation to church and village responsibilities, Cook Islander women serve as "primary administrators" of religious and community affairs.

== Violence ==
In Cook Islander society, any person who commits domestic violence against women receives severe forms of punishment.

== Burial customs ==
By adhering to culture, women in the Cook Islands are buried inside burial vaults located in front of the yards of houses, particularly the woman who is known to be the builder of the said home. The coffins of women are traditionally sealed in the burial vaults as a form of respect; in Cook Islander culture, it is "considered disrespectful to cover [the bodies of women] in dirt after death.

== Arts and crafts ==
Cook island women are known to weave the tivaevae, a form of textile art to adorn cushion covers and bedspreads. Women also weave other arts and crafts products such as pandanus mats, purses, fans, and baskets. Women also practice the making of flower art in the form of creating necklaces known as the ei and tiaras known as the ei katu. Women in the Cook Islands are also popular for specializing in creating jewelry using black pearls.

== Politics ==
Women in Rarotonga, the most populous island of the Cook Islands, won the right to vote in 1893, shortly after New Zealand.

== See also ==
- House of Ariki
- Culture of the Cook Islands
