= Mamao Keneseli =

Tuvaluan women's community development leader

Mamao Keneseli is a Tuvaluan women's community development leader, activist and teacher. She is noted for her work on Nui atoll, where she has fought to raise the status of women. She began a career in teaching primary school children in 1981, and in 1990 she became involved with running a women's handicraft centre, teaching women how to develop their skills and earn a living. In 2010 she was made director of the Matapulapula Women's Group on Nui. She has since passed on the position but remains active with Matapulapula. Lanuola Fasiai, the Senior Officer in the Tuvalu Government Gender Office described Keneseli as "a woman of action who walks the talk and is a role model in her community". In 2017 the Pacific Community named her one of "70 Inspiring Pacific Women".
