= Kathryn Relang =

Marshallese women's rights activist

Kathryn Relang is a Marshallese women's rights activist, who is a former Executive Director of Women United Together Marshall Islands (WUTMI).

== Biography ==
Relang was born in the Marshall Islands and lived there until she was nine years old when her father was appointed Ambassador to the United Nations and the family moved to New York. Six years later the family moved to Oregon, the state that her mother was from. Relang attended high school there before studying Anthropology and Linguistics at the University of Hawaiʻi. After graduation she moved to the Marshall Islands, and soon after began to work for Women United Together Marshall Islands (WUTMI), initially as co-ordinator on a domestic violence prevention project. WUTMI is the national umbrella organisation for women's advocacy across the Marshall Islands.

During her time at WUTMI, Relang worked on several projects, including: youth empowerment in the workplace; providing support services for survivors of domestic violence; raising awareness about legal rights in domestic violence cases; the importance of women's roles in conservation. Under her leadership, in 2016, WUTMI signed a Memorandum of Understanding with the Domestic Violence Prevention Unit of Marshall Islands Police.

In 2018 she left WUTMI for a new role at Pacific Community as Country Focal Officer. She is chair of the Board of Regents for the College of the Marshall Islands, and was also on the board of the Marshall Islands Conservation Society.
