= Milikini Failautusi =

Tuvaluan activist (born 1990)

Milikini Failautusi (born 2 February 1990) is an activist from Tuvalu in the areas of youth, climate change, gender, human rights, indigenous rights, and sexual reproductive health and rights.

Failautusi is the coordinator of the Tuvalu National Youth Council and a member of the Pacific Youth Council, Pacific Climate Warriors and the Pacific Young Women Leadership Alliance. She represented Tuvalu at the United Nations Economic and Social Commission for Asia and the Pacific meeting in Bangkok in 2014.

In 2014 Failautusi said that cultural issues are preventing women of Tuvalu from working in equal partnership with men. For example, women cannot be appointed as an aliki (chief). She is quoted as saying "[w]hen it comes to cultures, women they don't [get] to say anything at all. They don't have a say. They only have to sit at the back and support the elders or their husbands or the leaders in their families . . . All they have to do is just support them in terms of looking for money, looking for food, and looking after the babies and the families".

She actively works for equal participation of women in government and leadership, equal wages for women, and calling for a stop to domestic and gender based violence.

Mikilini Failautusi had to leave her atoll for the main island Funafuti due to rising tides.
