= Women in Tuvalu =

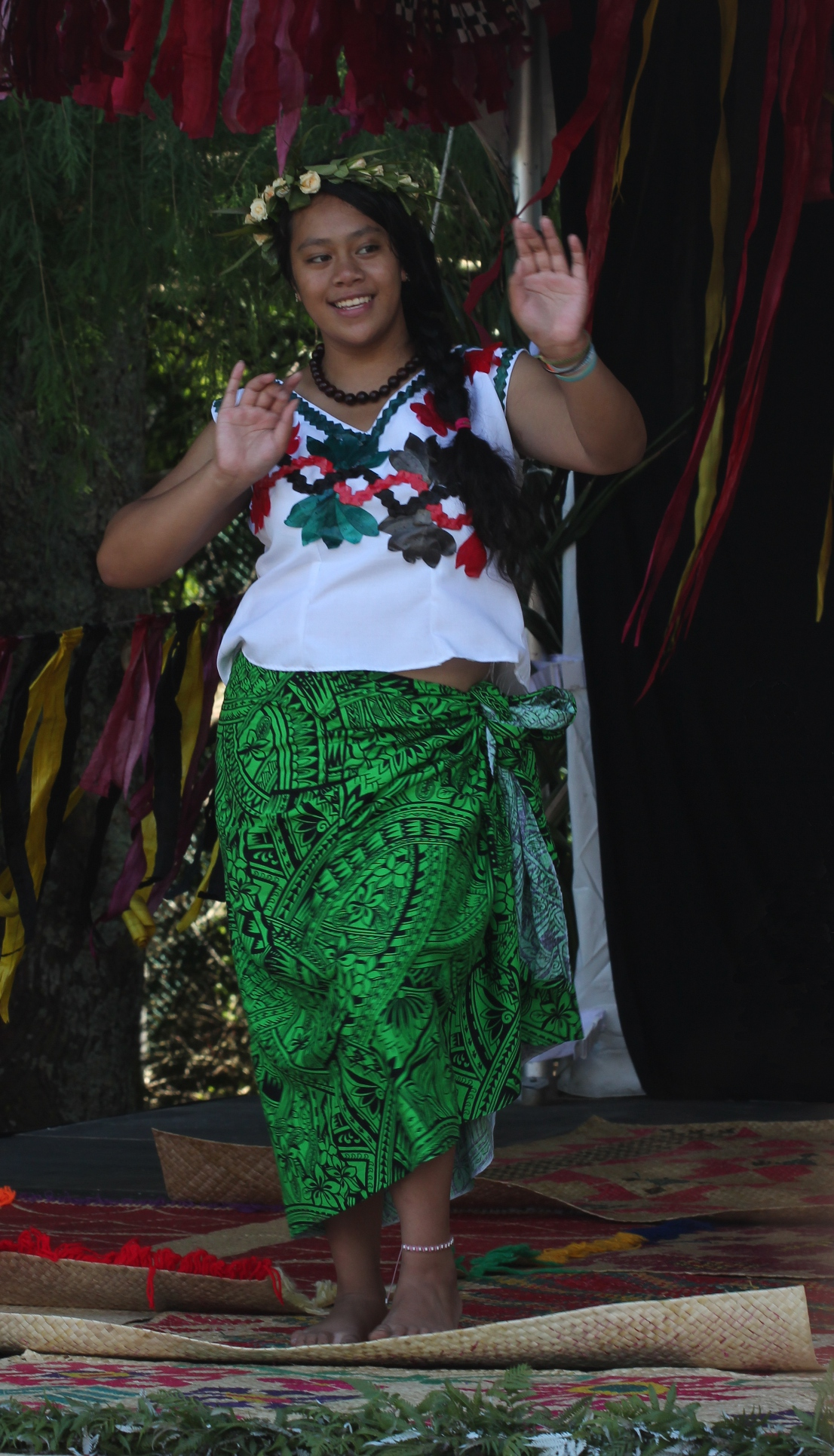
Tuvaluan woman performing a traditional dance at Auckland's Pasifika Festival in 2011.

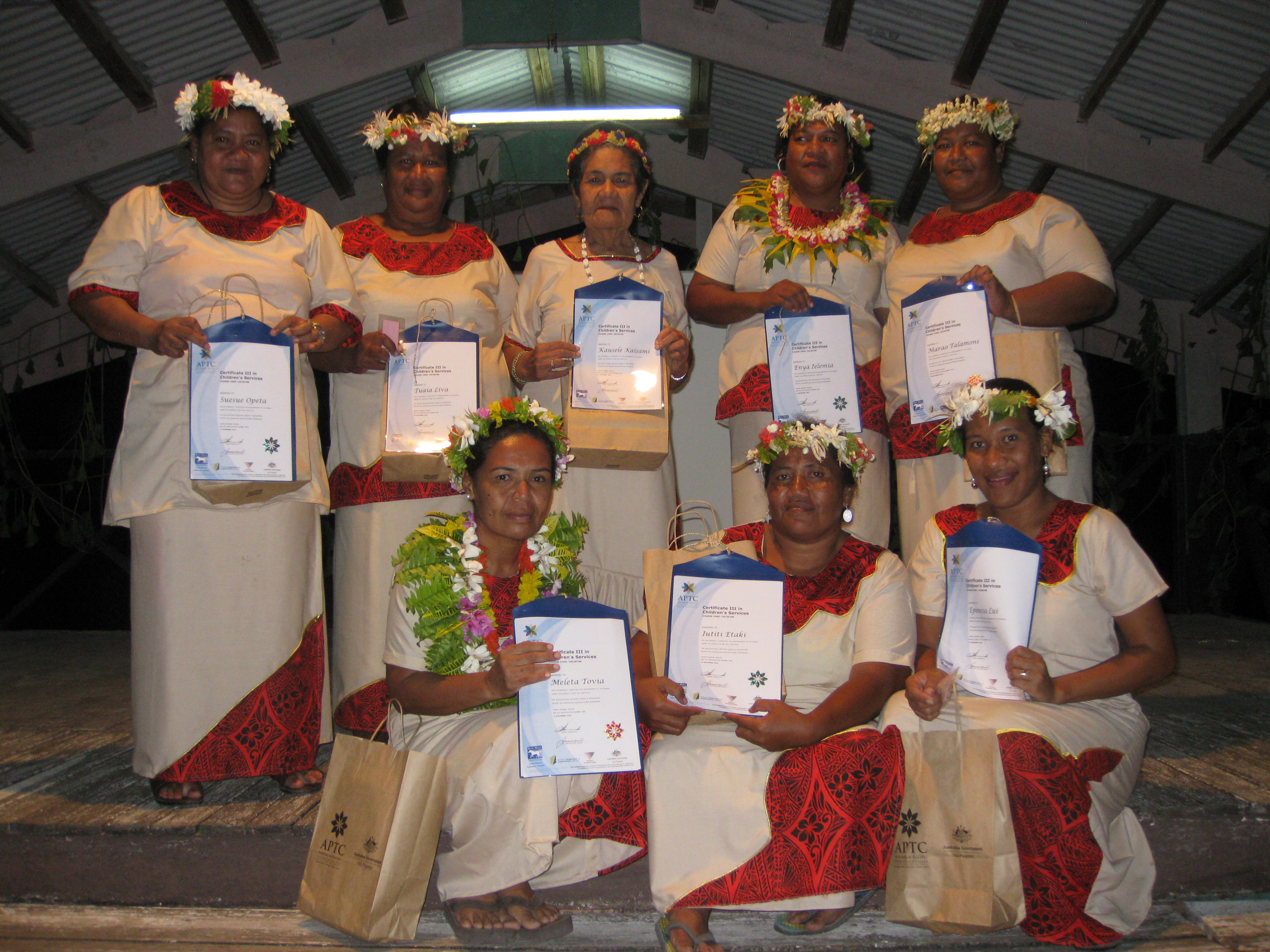
Australian Pacific Technical Coalition (APTC) graduation, Tuvalu, 2011. Photo- AusAID

Women in Tuvalu continue to maintain a traditional Polynesian culture within a predominantly Christian society. Tuvaluan cultural identity is sustained through an individual's connection to their home island. In the traditional community system in Tuvalu, each family has its own task, or salanga, to perform for the community. The skills of a family are passed on from parents to children. The women of Tuvalu participate in the traditional music of Tuvalu and in the creation of the art of Tuvalu including using cowrie and other shells in traditional handicrafts. There are opportunities of further education and paid employment with non-government organisations (NGOs) and government enterprises, education and health agencies being the primary opportunities for Tuvaluan women.

The number of women holding positions of Assistant Secretaries in government departments has increased from 20% in 2012 to nearly 50% in 2014. Also at the nine Island Kaupule (Local Councils) the representation of women has increased from 1 in 2012 to 3 in 2014.

With regard to the judiciary, "the first female Island Court magistrate was appointed to the Island Court in Nanumea in the 1980s and another in Nukulaelae in the early 1990s." There were 7 female magistrates in the Island Courts of Tuvalu (as of 2007) in comparison "to the past where only one woman magistrate served in the Magistrate Court of Tuvalu."

== Music ==
Women participate in the traditional music of Tuvalu which consists of a number of dances, including the fatele, fakaseasea and the fakanau. The fatele, in its modern form, is performed at weddings, community events and to celebrate leaders and other prominent individuals.

== Education ==
Tuvaluan women have access to secondary education at Motufoua Secondary School on Vaitupu and Fetuvalu Secondary School, a day school operated by the Church of Tuvalu, on Funafuti. Three tertiary institutions offer technical and vocational courses for women: Tuvalu Atoll Science Technology Training Institute (TASTII), Australian Pacific Training Coalition (APTC) and University of the South Pacific (USP) Extension Centre. There are opportunities of further education and paid employment with non-government organisations (NGOs) and government enterprises, education and health agencies being the primary opportunities for Tuvaluan women.

== Society ==
Tuvaluan women are primarily involved in traditional agriculture and domestic and community activities. The women of Tuvalu participate in the creation of the art of Tuvalu including using cowrie and other shells in traditional handicrafts.

Tuvaluan women participate in sport, such as in the women's football league competition, the Tuvalu A-Division for women, and at international competitions such as representing Tuvalu at the Pacific Games. Asenate Manoa represented Tuvalu at the 2015 Pacific Games and won a bronze medal in powerlifting (72 kg Female - TOTAL 340 kg). She had previously represented Tuvalu in the 100 metres sprint at 2008 Summer Olympics, at the 2009 World Championships & 2011 World Championships and at the 2012 Summer Olympics. She also participated in the women’s long jump event at the 2017 Pacific Mini Games.

Between 2004 and 2005 the number of women that obtained a credit from the Development Bank of Tuvalu increased from 16% to 30% compared to the number of men obtaining credit, which increased from 31% to 41%. However, the total loan approval rate is still lower for women at 37% compared to men at 63%, and the total loan value for men accounts for 74% of the total credit given.

Remittances from Tuvaluan men employed abroad as sailors, primarily on cargo ships, is a major source of income for families in Tuvalu. The Global Economic Crisis (GEC) that began in 2007 has impacted on global export-import activities and the demand for shipping, which reduced the need for seafarers from Tuvalu.

Generally men aged 50 years, and on some islands men aged 60 years, do most of the talking and decision making at meetings of the community councils (Falekaupule), which are organised according to the law and custom of each island. Although women have the vote in meetings of the Falekaupule on 7 of the 9 islands, but most do no exercise their voting rights. In 2014, Milikini Failautusi, a Tuvaluan activist, said that cultural issues in Tuvalu are preventing women from working in equal partnership with men. For example, women cannot be appointed as an aliki (chief). Ms Failautusi is quoted as saying "[w]hen it comes to cultures, women they don't [get] to say anything at all. They don't have a say. They only have to sit at the back and support the elders or their husbands or the leaders in their families . . . All they have to do is just support them in terms of looking for money, looking for food, and looking after the babies and the families".

Tuvaluan women are active in community organisations, such as, Mrs. Alisa Taukave, President of the Tuvalu Association of Non Government Organizations (TANGO), which is an umbrella organisation for community organisations. NGOs in Tuvalu include: Tuvalu Family Health Association (TuFHA); Tuvalu Red Cross; Fusi Alofa Association – (FAA Tuvalu), which improves the lives of persons with disabilities; and National Youth Council, which is an umbrella organisation for 15 youth groups from Funafuti and outer islands. In 1980 the Tuvalu National Council for Women was established to act as an umbrella organisation for 17 women's rights groups throughout the country. It advocates for greater participation and decision-making in society for women, and provides educational programmes.

== Life expectancy ==
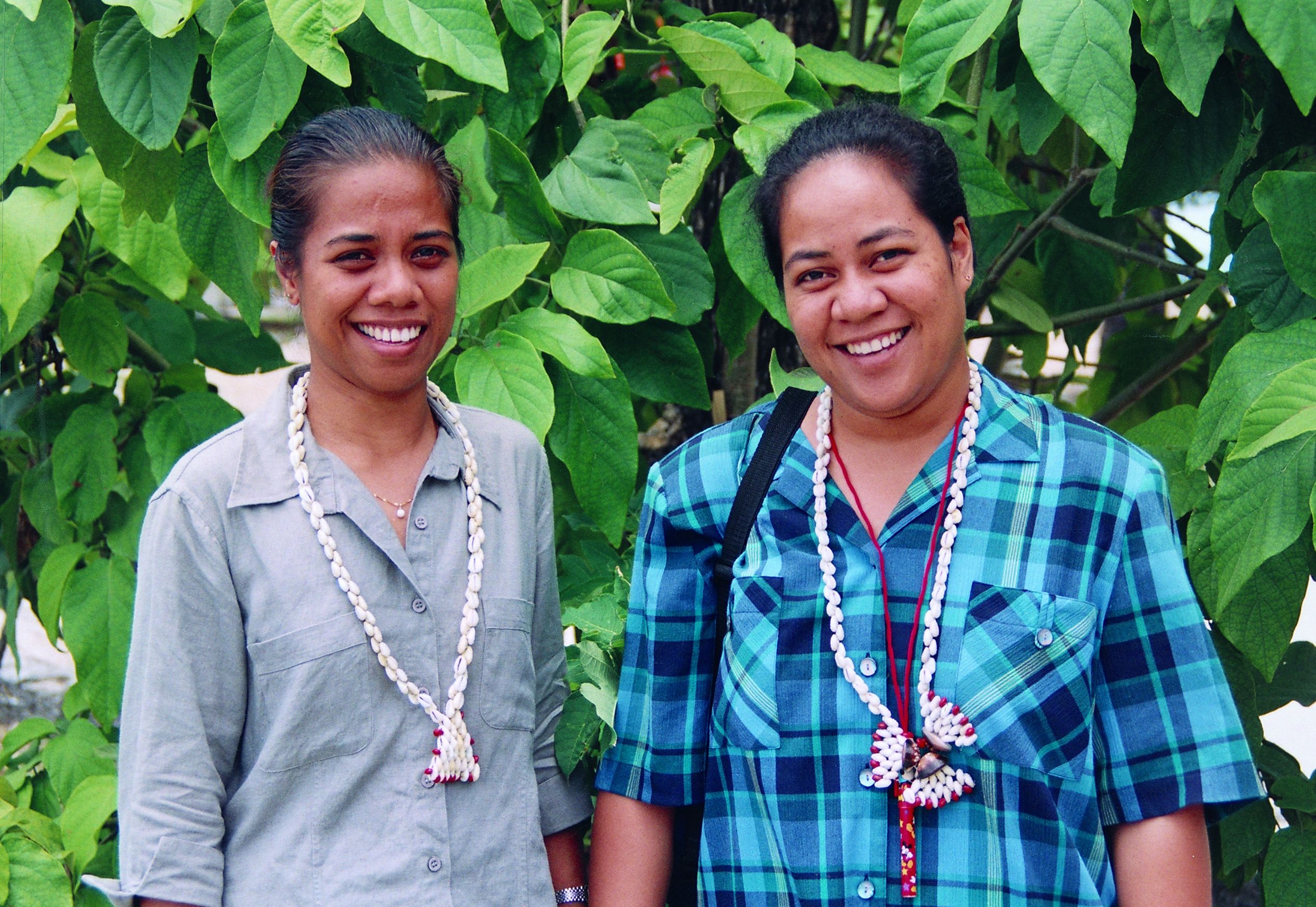
Tuvaluan doctors (2008) Dr Nese Ituaso-Conway (left) and Dr Miliama Simeona (right)

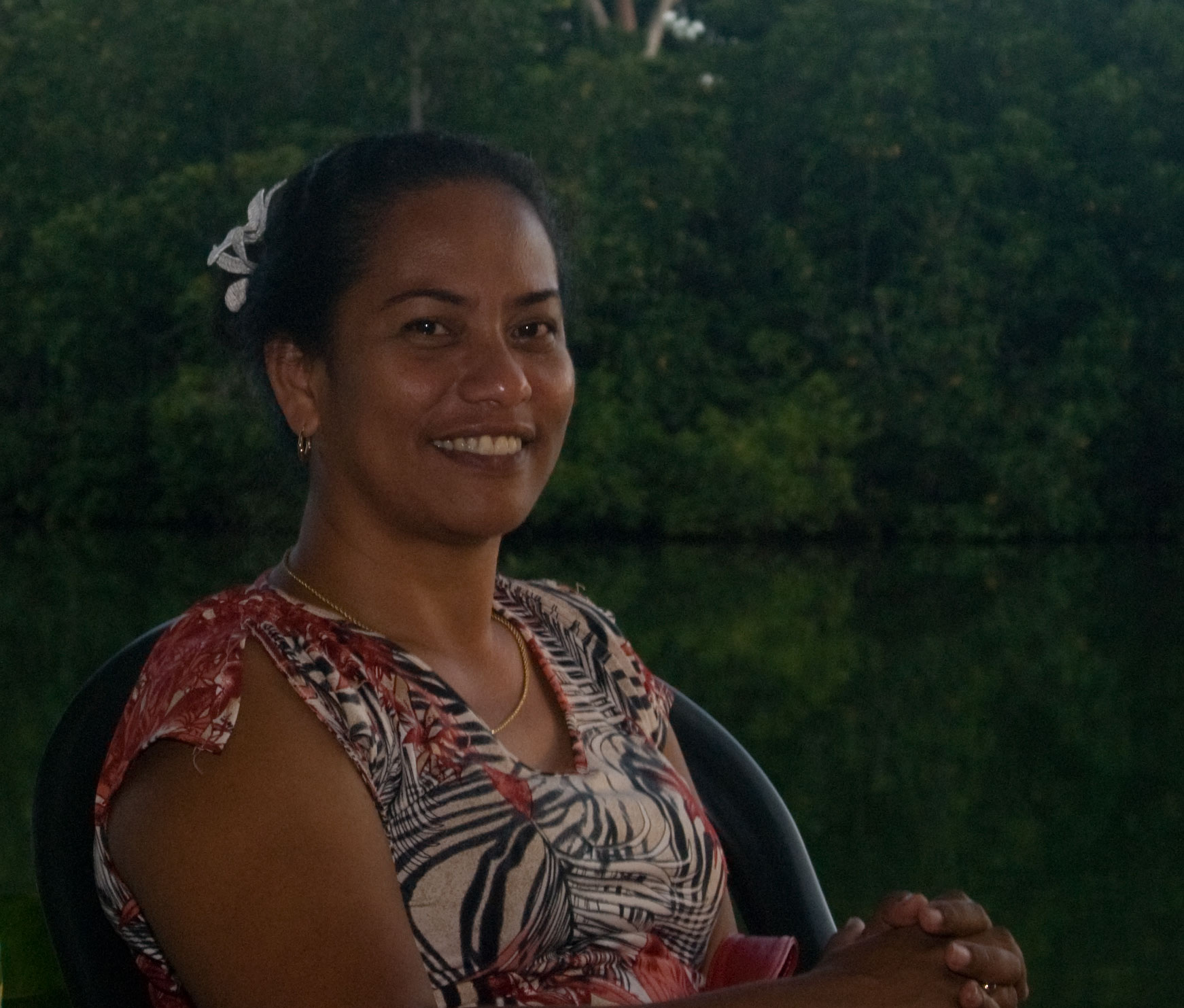
Tuvaluan woman (2008)

Life expectancy for Tuvaluan women is 68.41 years as compared to 64.01 years for males (2015 est.).

== Health ==
Tuvaluan women have access to health services provided by the Department of Health. There is one hospital, the Princess Margaret Hospital, in Funafuti that provides referral and general health services to support the health clinics on each of Tuvalu's outer islands. Because Tuvalu is a group of 9 islands, problems in obtaining emergency services can arise for women on the outer islands if complications occur during birth. Infant mortality in Tuvalu was 25 deaths per 1,000 live births in 2012, with an under-five mortality rate of 30 deaths per 1,000 live births. There has been a consistent decline in the under-five mortality rate since 1990.

The Princess Margaret Hospital is run by 8 medical officers, 20 nurses, 10 paramedical staff and 10 support staff. The other islands have a medical centre staffed by two nurses, a nurse assistant and two primary health care workers.

There are no private formal medical services available in Tuvalu. Non-government organizations provide health services, such as: the Tuvalu Red Cross Society; Fusi Alofa (the care and rehabilitation of disabled children); the Tuvalu Family Health Association (training and support on sexual and reproductive health); and the Tuvalu Diabetics Association (training and support on diabetes).

== Politics ==
Throughout the history of the Parliament of Tuvalu following independence in 1978, three women have been elected: Naama Maheu Latasi, from 1989 to 1997 and Pelenike Isaia from 2011 to 2015; and Dr Puakena Boreham who was elected to represent Nui in the 2015 general election, and served as an MP until the 2024 general election.

The under-representation of women in the Tuvalu parliament was considered in a report commissioned by the Pacific Islands Forum Secretariat in 2005, and was discussed during a consultation entitled “Promoting Women in Decision Making” was held in Funafuti in May 2010. Saini Simona, the Director of Women Affairs in Tuvalu, spoke in support of a proposal to have seats reserved for women in the Parliament of Tuvalu. The outcome of the consultation was a recommendation for the introduction of two new seats, to be reserved for women. The Tuvaluan Ministry for Home Affairs, which has responsibility for women's affairs, stated that steps would be taken to consider the recommendation.

== Prominent Tuvaluan women ==
Women from Tuvalu, such as Moira Simmons-Avafoa, have been encouraged to become leaders in discussion around climate change since it disproportionately affects women and children.

Mamao Keneseli is a community development leader on Nui atoll, where she became involved with running a women's handicraft centre in 1990, teaching women how to develop their skills and earn a living. From 2010 to 2017 she was the director of the Matapulapula Women's Group.

In 2024, Lilian Falealuga Tine served as Director for the Tuvalu Post Limited. She has also served as a Director for the Development Bank of Tuvalu. Previously she worked for the Department of Rural Development of Tuvalu and as First Secretary at the Tuvalu Embassy in Brussels, Belgium. She has also been the Interim Coordinator of Tuvalu National Council of Women, and Secretary General for the Tuvalu Red Cross Society.

Dr. Nese Ituaso-Conway was the Permanent Secretary of the Ministry of Ministry of Public Works, Infrastructure, Environment, Labor, Meteorology and Disaster in 2020, and was the Permanent Secretary of the Office of the Prime Minister of Tuvalu in 2018. She was previously the Director of Public Health at Princess Margaret Hospital (Funafuti).

== Legislation ==
The problem of violence against Tuvaluan women was highlighted during a week of events in recognition of International Women's Day in March 2013. The traditional cultural values prevent or discourage women from reporting assaults. Legislative changes are proposed to give the Tuvalu police increased powers and allowing the courts to pass tougher sentences for crimes of violence against women.

== Convention on the Elimination of all Forms of Discrimination against Women ==
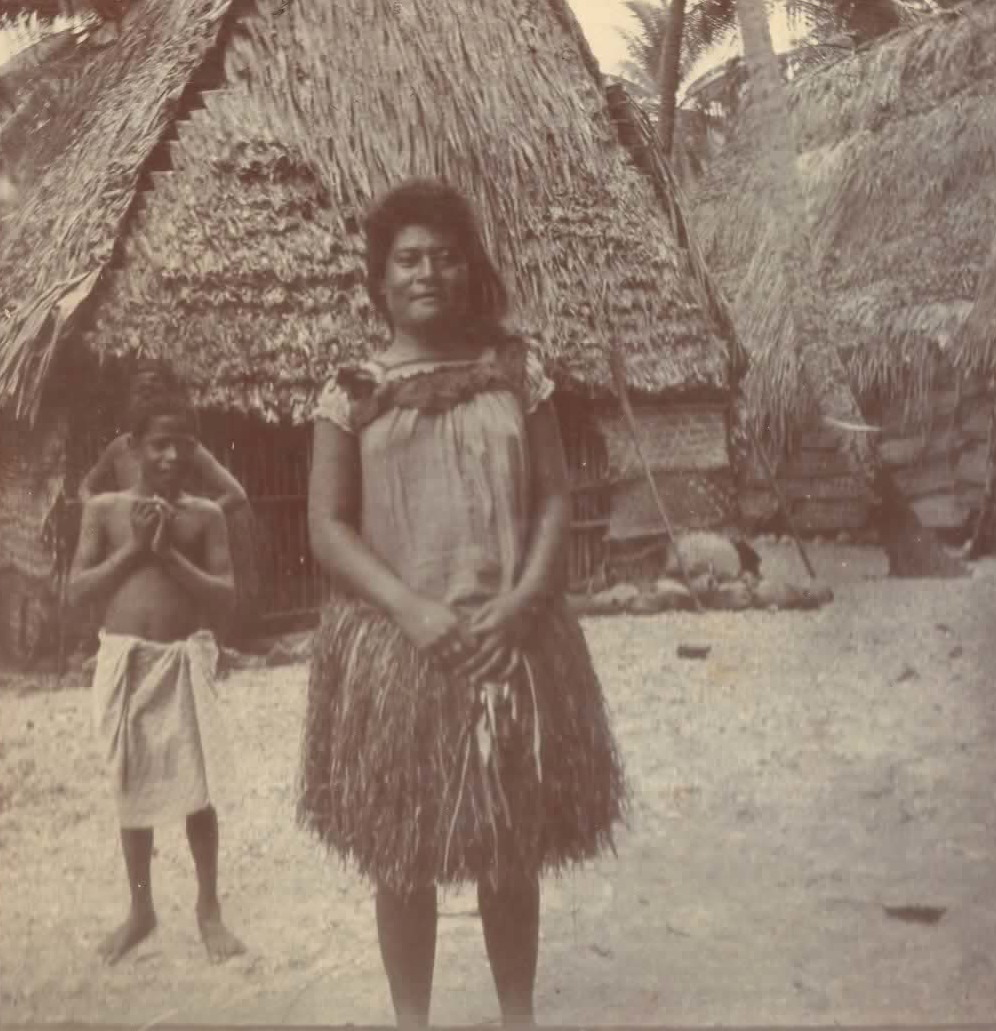
Tamala of Nukufetau atoll, Ellice Islands (circa 1900–1910)

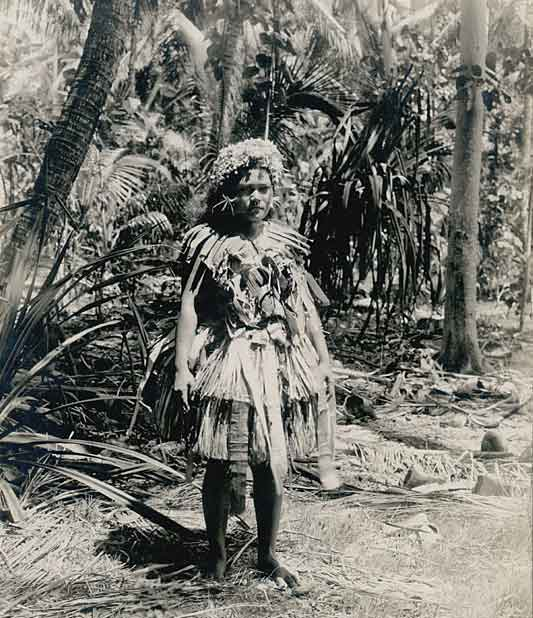
Woman on Funafuti, Photograph by Harry Clifford Fassett (1900)

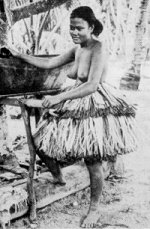
A portrait of a woman on Funafuti in 1894 by Count Rudolf Festetics de Tolna

In July 2009 Tuvalu reported on compliance with the 1979 Convention on the Elimination of All Forms of Discrimination Against Women (CEDAW) to the UN CEDAW Committee. The report said that “Committee’s experts expressed concern over the sanctioning of local custom in the [Tuvalu] Constitution and legal system, noting, for example, that husbands were permitted to ‘discipline’ their wives [as well as children]”. As recent many Tuvaluan families have migrated to New Zealand these practices are in direct conflict with New Zealand’s laws and social environment.

In July 2013 the Pacific Regional Rights Resource Team of the Secretariat of the Pacific Community published drafting options for legislative reform to assist Tuvalu to make changes to the laws and policies relating to violence against women in order to ensure the full protection of women from all forms of violence.

The UN CEDAW Committee observations on the 2015 review of Tuvalu notes the introduction of new domestic violence legislation, more participation by women in local council meetings and the end of some discriminatory education practices. However the Committee highlighted that women in Tuvalu continue to have low levels of political participation and economic participation. Violence against women is also described as a concern because of the "cultural and the silence and also impunity and this also really stops women to report the cases." The Family Protection and Domestic Violence Act 2014 provides greater protection for women and girls from violence within domestic relationships and also provide for shelters of victims of domestic violence.

== See also ==
- Demographics of Tuvalu
- Human rights in Tuvalu
- Women in Oceania
