= Women in Guam =

Women in Guam are residents of the unincorporated territory of the United States of Guam.

== Culture ==
According to Guamanian culture, women are the managers of family resources, such as land and food, which makes them popular in the family set-up, especially with children. Women participate in the wage economy and in the agricultural sector.

In Chamorro culture the gender roles for males and females are distinct and balanced. For example, the oldest daughter in the Guamanian family traditionally shares power with the oldest son. The eldest daughter has the responsibility of caring for her parents during their elder days. Women, by tradition, are powerful figures within the household, while men excel in areas such as hunting and fishing.

Traditional gender roles within Guam changed during three centuries of colonialism. While men dominate the political sphere, women have become more involved and active participants in social, religious and cultural organizations. Roman Catholicism brought changes such as increasing the status government, business, and church, while women adopted roles related to controlling the family. During the second half of the 20th century, some women were elected as political officials and as leaders in many civic and governmental organizations.

In the practice of poksai, a common form of adoption in Guamanian society, childless Guamanian women may raise a niece or a nephew as a family member, then known as the clan or extended family (the core of Guamanian society).

== English literacy ==
Chamorro women are categorized into three evolutionary generations based on how they value English literacy. The first category valued English literacy for school education and official business domains. The second valued it for schooleducation and professional competence. The two generations are closely related. The only difference is the business purpose in the first. The third generation valued English literacy for private and public spheres of influence. Despite the differences, all three commonly use their original language Chamorro for religious purposes inclusive of prayer and songs.

== Elder rituals ==
The Chamorro people have a unique way of showing respect to elders. Children are taught at an early age how to seek ritual blessings from them. For example, before children go to play, they are advised to seek blessings from and demonstrate respect to their aunts and uncles by holding and smelling their hands. The Filipino Mano employ similar rituals, with the major purpose of demonstrating respect for elders. The role of the elder is not restricted to men, but may also include women.

== See also ==
- Women in Hawaii
- Women in Puerto Rico
- List of people from Guam
