= Women in Hawaii =

Women in Hawai'i reside in the Hawaiian Island and are citizens of the United States. Immigrants and Native Hawaiians make up the population of women in Hawai'i. Native Hawaiian women descended from Polynesians. Immigrants women came from many countries that created a cultural exchange in the island.

== History ==
=== Notable Women ===
==== Queen Ka'ahumanu ====
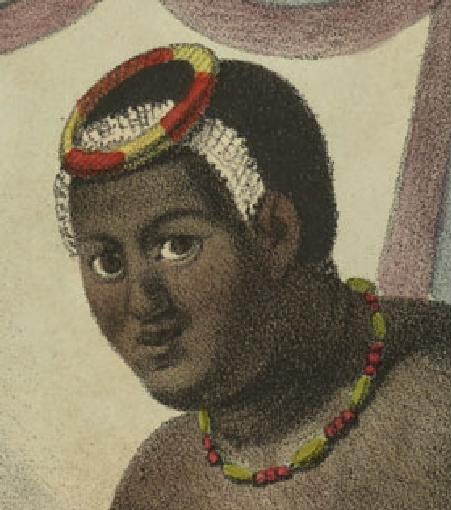
Queen Ka'ahumanu

Queen Ka'ahumanu was born between 1768 and 1777. After King Kamehameha I died, Queen Ka'ahumanu enacted reforms like letting women eat with men and letting women eating certain foods that used to be prohibited. Queen Ka'ahumanu accepted the Christian faith from missionaries mid-1820s. She emphasized the importance of literature to the people in order for them to read the Christian Bible. Because of her faith, she created a new legal system. The new legal system was based on the Christian Ten Commandments.

==== Queen Lili'uokalani ====
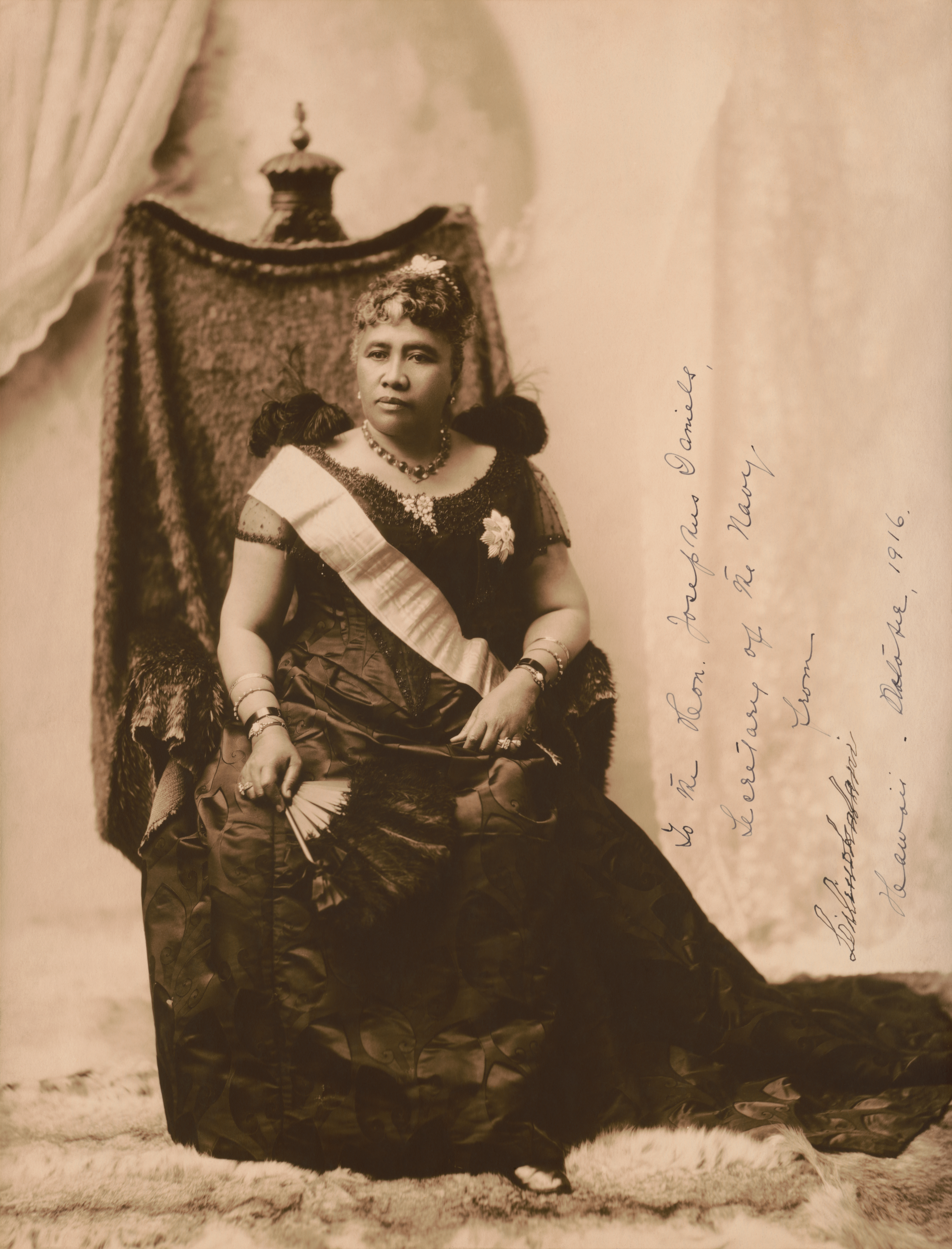
Queen Liliuokalani

Queen Lili'uokalani was born in September 2, 1838. She was a passionate music composer, or a haku mele. She became a queen in 1891 and worked against the U.S. annexation of Hawai'i. Additionally, she created the Hawai'i 1892 Highways Act. She advocated highly for Hawaiian sovereignty. In a revolt, the provisional government put her under house arrest. The provisional government also made her give up the throne. As she lay in house arrest, she created songs. A song titled "Aloha 'Oe'" was able to be smuggled out while she was in house arrest. This song became popular so it was recognized as the national song.

==== Dr. Isabella Aiona Abbott ====
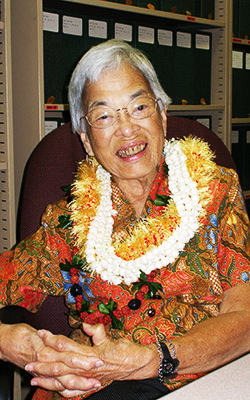
Dr. Isabella Abbott

Dr. Isabella Aiona Abbott was born on June 20, 1919. In her childhood, she would collect seaweed to use for cooking. The interest in seaweed continued through her adulthood. In 1950, she earned her doctorate at the University of California, Berkeley in botany. This made her the first Native Hawaiian women to earn a Ph.D. in science. She helped discover more than 200 species of seaweed. Additionally, she brought more knowledge on the benefits of plants in marine ecosystems.

== See also ==
- Liliuokalani
- Women in the Hawaii Territorial Legislature
- Women's suffrage in Hawaii
- Women in Guam
- Women in Puerto Rico
