= Vincent J.F. Huang =

- Born: 1971 (age 54–55); Nantou County, Taiwan
- Education: National Taichung Institute of Technology; Robert Gordon University, Aberdeen; CEIBS, Shanghai
- Known for: Conceptual art, installation art, painting
- Notable work: In the Name of Civilization; Prisoner's Dilemma; Modern Atlantis; The Last Enjoyment Before Melting; The Last Penguins-Taichi; The Last Penguins-Terra-Cotta Penguins; Suicide Penguins; Naked Truth; Dried Little Mermaid in Tuvalu
- Movement: Eco art (ecoart)
- Awards: 2013 Taiwan presidential Culture Award (Presented by Taiwan presidential Hall, Taiwan)
- Website: tuvalupavilion.com modernatlantis.com

Vincent J.F. Huang (simplified Chinese: 黄瑞芳; traditional Chinese: 黃瑞芳; pinyin: Huáng Ruìfāng; born 1971) is a Taiwanese eco artist notable for his collaboration with the country of Tuvalu, which is forecast to be the first nation to disappear due to sea level rise, and his selection as the first Taiwanese artist to create a National Pavilion at the Venice Biennale. Huang also acted as an official delegate for the country of Tuvalu at the United Nations Framework Convention on Climate Change during the 2012 COP18 session in Doha, Qatar, and caught media attention even earlier due to his guerrilla-style artworks and urban installations in the United Kingdom, Tuvalu, and Europe. Huang works primarily in the medium of visual art, especially sculpture and painting, and uses black humor and allusions to classical Chinese stories and images to contemplate the consequences of human consumption and the dangers of climate change.

== Life and career ==
Huang was born in 1971 in Nantou County, Taiwan. After receiving his bachelor's degree in commercial art from National Taichung Institute of Technology in Taiwan in 1998, Huang obtained his MFA from Gray's School of Art, Robert Gordon University in Scotland in 2000. In the early to mid 2000s, Huang was a senior art lecturer at the Department of Visual Communication, ShuTe University and the curator of Art Space at Taiwan's premier research institution, Academia Sinica. In the late 2000s, Huang decided to diversify, studying for and receiving an EMBA from the China Europe International Business School (CEIBS; ranked the 7th best international EMBA program by Financial Times in 2012) in 2009. During his time at CEIBS, Huang also founded the first Contemporary Art Club at the institution and now acts as its general secretary.

During this period, Huang also participated in over forty group and solo exhibitions, including shows in London, Sydney, São Paulo, Shanghai, Beijing, Taiwan, and Hanover. Fascinated by consumer culture and the potential destruction of the Earth due to capitalism, Huang's art has long centered on environmental issues, and in 2009 after hearing Ian Fry's speech on behalf of the sinking Pacific island nation of Tuvalu at the UNFCCC COP15 Session in Copenhagen, Huang began his collaboration with the government of Tuvalu. Huang has traveled to Tuvalu twice to develop artworks onsite and was appointed an official delegate for Tuvalu at the UNFCCC COP18 Session in Doha, Qatar, where he staged an exhibition of black humor works on behalf of the island nation. A major peak in Huang's cooperation with the Tuvalu government was his appointment as their art representative at the 2013 Venice Biennale (the 55th International Art Exhibition-la Biennale di Venezia), where Huang created the first ever National Pavilion for Tuvalu and became the first Taiwanese artist to create a National Pavilion for the event. In late September, Huang will travel to the Arctic with the Arctic Circle project, which is sponsored by the Farm Foundation in New York, to continue his eco artworks for Tuvalu and plans to attend the UNFCCC COP19 session in Warsaw later this year.

== Works ==
Huang's recent works include the following:

=== In the Name of Civilization ===
(2013/steel and motors): In this project, Huang transformed the original function of an oil pump into that of a killing machine, which brutally murdered natural species via viewer participation. As viewers squeezed a hand-held oil pump, rising sea levels registered on a gas meter and a giant oil rig was activated, decapitating a sea turtle and hanging the Wall Street bull. This specific work was then used to form a massive interactive installation at the 2013 Venice Biennale and served as a metaphor for human civilization's destruction of the natural environment.

=== Prisoner's Dilemma ===
(2013/fiber glass and digital print on scroll paper): Also featured at the Venice Biennale, Prisoner’s Dilemma depicts the Statue of Liberty kneeling to portraits of penguin terra-cotta soldiers (symbolic of the Terracotta Army) who represent the shadows of an ancient Chinese custom of creating objects for sacrifice—just as our current lifestyle negatively affects and "sacrifices" penguins. The Statue of Liberty in Prisoner's Dilemma does not single out the United States, but the statue is used to symbolize highly advanced human civilization and the fact that humans have become slaves to self-indulgence and desire and, in fact, prisoners to their lifestyles. If viewers can let go of their egos and kneel down in repentance in front of the sacrificed penguins, we may finally have an opportunity to set things right.

=== Modern Atlantis ===
(2013/aquarium, eco-marine system, live coral, lionfish, and starfish): The Modern Atlantis project, which was also a significant work at the Venice Biennale, features an aquarium that houses coral reefs growing on miniature sculptures depicting iconic landmarks of civilized and capitalist society. To create a truly modern Atlantis, civilized mankind is flooded by rising sea levels, becoming an underwater spectacle as climate change continues. By contrast, the coral in the aquarium is free to grow until all resources in the tank are completely consumed and the landmarks of civilization have disappeared.

=== Turtle Carpet ===
(2013/rubber): Turtle Carpet was originally situated at the entrance to the enclosure containing the installations Tuvalutis and Modern Atlantis at the Tuvalu Pavilion. The work consists of a rubber "rug" molded into the shape of several Tuvalu turtles that show signs of being run over, stepped on, and otherwise mutilated. The viewer is forced to tread on the turtles during the exhibition, which triggers a shocking screaming sound, reminding the audience of the often unwitting damage they cause to the environment every day.

=== The Last Enjoyment Before Melting ===
(2010/traditional Chinese ink painting on silk): This work transforms the history of a famous classical Chinese painting (The Night Revels of Han Xizai; Southern Tang), transferring a scene in which, when unable to face inevitable war and service to an unrighteous government, the subjects choose endless carousing and singing, into a depiction of penguins who, when unable to save the Earth from destruction, have no choice but to engage in a final banquet of enjoyment and leisure.

=== The Last Penguins-Taichi ===
(2010/fiber glass): The Last Penguins-Taichi employs the Eastern philosophy of "all things in harmonious coexistence." Penguins wearing ancient Eastern dress and ornaments form the focus of the installation. Before global warming inevitably destroys these animal victims, forcing them to melt into the sea, the sacrificed penguins appear in final tai chi poses, attempting to mitigate the environmental peril created by humankind.

=== The Last Penguins-Terra-Cotta Penguins ===
(2010/fiber glass): In this piece, a reference to the 1987 movie The Last Emperor directed by Bernardo Bertolucci, the historical practice by which Chinese terra-cotta warriors were used as sacrificial objects for the cruel Qin Shi Huang, the first emperor of a unified China, is transformed into an installation depicting a group of penguins in terra-cotta warrior dress who signify the sacrifices made by the global environment in the name of the development of human civilization. The terra-cotta soldiers, which were formerly funeral objects, became the treasures of human civilization after they were unearthed. By contrast, after being "un-iced," the terra-cotta penguins will disappear because of global warming, thereby becoming funeral objects once again.

=== Suicide Penguins ===
(2010/fiber glass): Suicide Penguins, a project involving hanged penguin victims, was conducted in front of the Tate Modern in London in 2010. During this project, penguin and polar bear victims unable to tolerate the destruction of the natural world (as caused by humankind) hanged themselves in despair. In view of their helplessness, these victims engaged in a protest performance in which they braved the tortures of death to admonish the human world against further environmental upheaval.

=== Naked Truth ===
(2010/fiber glass): Outraged at global warming and neglect of environmental issues, penguins removed their "overcoats," that is, their skin, and evolved into hairless or "naked" penguins. After taking this drastic action, the penguins launched protest activities in European cities to warn the world of the dangers that could befall human and animal society if global warming was not stopped.

=== Dried Little Mermaid in Tuvalu ===
(2010/local dried coconuts): After the 2009 Copenhagen Climate Summit (2009 United Nations Climate Change Conference) failed, Huang used dried coconuts found on the shores of Tuvalu, which had fallen because of sea level rise and the toppling of coconut trees, to assemble a grieving mermaid symbolic of the failures at Copenhagen. This piece was then burned during the night as an accusation of and protest against humankind's neglect of environmental and climate problems in favor of the pursuit of rapid economic development.

== Work philosophy ==
According to his introduction in Tuvalu Pavilion: 55th International Art Exhibition-la Biennale di Venezia:

Huang uses contemporary methods to address human influences on the environment. The works attribute environmental deterioration to the pursuit of growth and technological advancement. The artist suggests that these concepts are part of public consciousness and advocates for reflection on human behavior regarding the planet.

Huang also employs the ideology of influential Chinese philosopher Zhuangzi that all life on Earth shall live together harmoniously. He transforms the famous Five Dynasties masterpiece The Night Revels of Han Xizai by replacing the members of the court with penguins. This humorous arrangement of penguins enjoying their last feast before the ice poles melt away metaphorically suggests that many species face extinction but can in no way escape this tragic fate. Huang portrays the penguins as poetic heroes and representative of the primary victims of global warming, constructing statues and fragile portraits of these animals."

In essence, Huang's works focus on current affairs around the world and encompass pressing issues concerning the environment and technology. He investigates humankind's rapid consumption of Earth's resources in the name of civilized development, which began with the inauguration of the Industrial Revolution. Furthermore, Huang examines the idea that although consumerism is valued in our modern society, such behavior has produced drastic climate change and instances of nature “striking back.” This encourages the viewers of his works to contemplate what exactly our modern age of technological advancement will lead us to in the future.

By combining historical and animal images, Huang presents his concerns regarding global situations, and emphasizes that mankind's pursuit of economic miracles has led to a gradual neglect of ecological preservation. The purpose of Huang's contemporary art is not to deconstruct the ideal of a “Brave New World,” but to warn people that technology and the progression of “civilizing” influences can trigger environmental crisis.

== Critical response ==
Many of the critiques written regarding Huang's work have focused on the positive and revolutionary aspects of his installations in the field of eco or "green" art, but several commentators have highlighted the seeming lack of a profound message in Huang's works and the disconnect between calls for "environmental protection" inherent in Huang's art and his own environmentally detrimental actions in creating this art.

=== Positive ===
MvF Art Historian Ariadne Arendt described Huang's art as "entrenched within the current anthropocentric fine art discourse" and comments that Huang "probes the animal/human question through creating juxtapositions of familiar definitions and stereotypes, placing them in such a way that they jar and create humour, but also reveal their discontinuities" Furthermore, in an article written for Taiwan's ARTCO Magazine and later expanded in English translation, Professor Szu-hsien Li provided the following commentary:

"When a rich and powerful new China emerges on the horizon, when the 'China concept' deepens the gap between those on center stage and those on edges, Taiwan’s marginalization is all the more outstanding. How can Taiwan artists afford not to worry? How can Vincent JF Huang’s penguins not become their own projection? Luckily the artist is able to dispel the embarrassment with humor. Vincent JF Huang polishes the usually crude appropriation of Chinese images, and he turns his position as a Taiwan artist in the global Chinese context to his favor. Unique contexts give birth to unique art. The Last Penguins is the best illustration. As Vincent JF Huang mentioned in his Creative Notes, the ultimate purpose of The Last Penguins was to 'create bizarre scenes of self-indulgent penguins against the background of an increasingly globalized civilization to criticize the value system dominated by capitalism around the world.' Being in the minority, we artists can hardly expect that our efforts would waken the world to important global issues. However, Vincent JF Huang should be admired for extending care for the self into the care for all human beings, for upholding the spirit of the May Fourth Movement, and for being a contemporary intellectual in its true sense."

== See also ==
- Taiwanese art
