= Women United Together Marshall Islands =

- WUTMI logo
- Abbreviation: WUTMI
- Formation: 1987; 39 years ago
- Type: NGO
- Origins: Marshall Islands
- Region served: Marshall Islands
- Website: wutmi.com

Women United Together Marshall Islands (abbreviated as WUTMI) is a women's organization in Majuro, Marshall Islands.

== Works ==
WUTMI was established in 1987. It holds an annual conference about gender equality, community reslience and women's leadership, and receives financial aid from the Government of Australia and UN Women. The United Nations Development Programme considers WUTMI an international development partner.
